This is an Atlantic Records Discography, albums released on the Atlantic Records label from its founding up until 1982, ordered by catalog number. Two of the major series of LP recordings were the "1200" and "8000" series, started by Nesuhi Ertegun. The "1200" series was reserved for jazz albums. The "8000" and subsequent series, started shortly after the 1200 in 1956, featured Atlantic's R&B and pop albums; when the "1200" series was discontinued in the 1970s, the jazz albums were mixed with the R&B and pop albums in their respective series. This list includes albums using Atlantic's numbering system that were released under their numerous subsidiary labels. There is a section containing albums related to the label as well.

Discography

100 & 400 10-inch LP Series
Atlantic's first 33⅓ RPM LP records were 10-inch albums and their first release in 1949 was a recording of Walter Benton's poetry set to music which was also issued as three 12 inch 78 RPM records. This was followed by two albums in 1950 with the bulk of Atlantic's 10-inch albums released between 1951 and 1953. The 100 Series released mainly instrumental jazz LPs and the 400 Series featured vocalists. The album catalog numbers were often denoted by the prefix "LP" on the album cover and "ALS" or "ALR" on the record label.

The 1200 "Jazz" Series
Atlantic commenced releasing 12 inch LP records with the establishment of their 1200 Series in 1949 with an album consisting of three 78 RPM records of Walter Benton's poetry. This was followed by a two record set of William Shakespeare's Romeo and Juliet in 1951.  Subsequent releases featured Dixieland, opera and selections from Broadway musicals before Nesuhi Ertegun took over responsibility for the LP series in 1955 and the series focussed almost exclusively on jazz releases. After one a very early experiment in 1953 stereo releases of Atlantic LPs began production in 1958 and by 1960 all releases were available in mono or stereo pressings – indicated by the prefix SD on the catalog number. The series continued until late 1977 when it concluded with SD 1700 and most of the popular jazz artists moved to the SD 18100 Series and a limited number of albums were released on the 8800 Series.

{| class="wikitable sortable"
|-
! Catalog
! Artist
! Album
! Notes
|-
|1201-3
| and Vernon Duke
|This Is My Beloved
|3 record 78 RPM set
|-
|1204-5
| and Richard Waring with Dennis King 
|Romeo and Juliet Scenes
|2 record 33⅓ RPM set produced by Margaret Webster
|-
|1206
| and Muggsy Spanier
|Duets
|
|-
|1207
|
|Marie Powers Concert
|
|-
|1208
|
|Wilbur de Paris and His Rampart Street Ramblers
|Issued in "binaural," an early stereo process
|-
|1209
| and Rex Stewart
|Big Jazz
|
|-
|1210
|
|Charles Sherrill Plays Music from "Show Boat" and "Roberta"
|
|-
|1211
|
|Charles Sherrill Plays Music from "Pal Joey" and "A Connecticut Yankee"
|
|-
|1212
| and His Giants
|The Swinging Mr. Rogers
|First album produced by Nesuhi Ertegun
|-
|1213
|
|Mabel Mercer Sings Cole Porter
|
|-
|1214
|
|Songs by Bobby Short
|
|-
|1215
|
|Paul Barbarin and His New Orleans Jazz
|
|-
|1216
| Octet
|Jazz & Romantic Places
|
|-
|1217
| and Warne Marsh
|Lee Konitz with Warne Marsh
|
|-
|1218
|
|Ted Straeter's New York
|
|-
|1219
|
|Wilbur de Paris and His New New Orleans Jazz 
|
|-
|1220
|
|Tony Fruscella
|
|-
|1221
|
|Wein, Women & Song
|
|-
|1222
|
|The Magic Piano
|
|-
|1223
| with Bob Gordon
|Arranged/Played/Composed by Jack Montrose
|
|-
|1224
|
|Lennie Tristano
|
|-
|1225
| and the Famous Sidemen
|Tribute to Benny Goodman
|
|-
|1226
|
|Nobody Else But Me
|
|-
|1227
|
|The Greatest Garner
|
|-
|1228
|
|Chris Connor
|
|-
|1229
|
|The Teddy Charles Tentet
|
|-
|1230
|
|Bobby Short
|
|-
|1231
|
|Fontessa
|
|-
|1232
| and His Giants
|Martians Come Back!
|
|-
|1233
| and His New New Orleans Jazz
|Marchin' and Shoutin|
|-
|1234
|
|The Boss of the Blues
|
|-
|1235
|
|Here Is Phineas
|
|-
|1236
|
|Rodgers Revisited
|
|-
|1237
|
|Pithecanthropus Erectus
|
|-
|1238
|
|The Jimmy Giuffre Clarinet
|
|-
|1239
|Various Artists
|Rock and Roll Forever
|Featuring Joe Turner, LaVern Baker, The Clovers, Clyde McPhatter & The Drifters, Ray Charles, Ruth Brown and T-Bone Walker
|-
|1240
|
|He Loves Me, He Loves Me Not
|
|-
|1241
|
|The World of Alcina
|
|-
|1242
|
|Ballads & Blues
|
|-
|1243
|
|Sylvia Syms Sings
|
|-
|1244
|
|Midnight at Mabel Mercer's
|
|-
|1245
| and Thomas Talbert
|Wednesday's Child
|
|-
|1246
|
|Baritone Sax
|
|-
|1247
| and Jimmy Giuffre
|The Modern Jazz Quartet at Music Inn
|
|-
|1248
|
|The Clovers
|
|-
|1249
| Octet
|Love Story
|
|-
|1250
|
|Bix, Duke, Fats
|
|-
|1251
|
|After the Lights Go Down Low
|
|-
|1252
| and Vernon Duke
|This Is My Beloved
|
|-
|1253
|
|Wilbur de Paris at Symphony Hall
|
|-
|1254
|
|The Jimmy Giuffre 3
|
|-
|1255
|
|Lush Life
|
|-
|1256
| with Phil Moore's Music
|That Satin Doll
|
|-
|1257
|
|Dizzy at Home and Abroad
|
|-
|1258
|
|Inside Hi-Fi
|
|-
|1259
|
|The Great Ray Charles
|
|-
|1260
|
|The Clown
|
|-
|1261
|Various Artists
|Dixieland at Jazz, Ltd.
|Featuring Sidney Bechet, Muggsy Spanier, Doc Evans, Don Ewell and Bill Reinhardt
|-
|1262
|
|Speaking of Love
|
|-
|1263
|
|The Warm Sound
|
|-
|1264
|
|Mood Jazz
|
|-
|1265
|
|The Modern Jazz Quartet
|
|-
|1266
| and Jimmy Witherspoon
|New Orleans Blues
|
|-
|1267
| & Sacha Distel
|Afternoon in Paris
|
|-
|1268
| & Lou Levy
|West Coast Wailers
|
|-
|1269
|
|Plenty, Plenty Soul
|
|-
|1270
| and His Giants
|Way Up There
|
|-
|1271
|/Barbara Carroll
|Ladies of Jazz
|
|-
|1272
|
|The John Lewis Piano
|
|-
|1273
|
|The Real Lee Konitz
|
|-
|1274
|
|Word from Bird
|
|-
|1275
|
|Knight Music
|
|-
|1276
| and His Music Men
|The Music Man
|
|-
|1277
|
|The Billy Taylor Touch
|Includes seven 1951 recordings originally issued on Piano Panorama with four tracks from 1957
|-
|1278
|Art Blakey's Jazz Messengers with Thelonious Monk
|Art Blakey's Jazz Messengers with Thelonious Monk
|
|-
|1279
| & Ray Charles
|Soul Brothers
|
|-
|1280
|
|The Most Happy Fella
|
|-
|1281
|
|LaVern Baker Sings Bessie Smith
|
|-
|1282
|
|Trav'lin' Light
|
|-
|1283
| and Mama Yancey
|Pure Blues
|
|-
|1284
|
|The Modern Jazz Quartet Plays No Sun in Venice
|
|-
|1285
|
|Sing Me a Swing Song
|
|-
|1286
|
|A Jazz Date with Chris Connor
|
|-
|1287
|Various Artists
|Jazz Piano International
|Featuring Derek Smith, Dick Katz and René Urtreger
|-
|1288
|
|Wilbur de Paris Plays Cole Porter
|
|-
|1289
|
|Ray Charles at Newport
|
|-
|1290
|
|Chris Craft
|
|-
|1291
|
|Warne Marsh
|
|-
|1292
|
|Here Is Chris Barber
|
|-
|1293
|
| Premiere Performance!
|George Byron Sings New & Rediscovered Jerome Kern Songs
|-
|1294
|
|Bags & Flutes
|
|-
|1295
|
|The Four Brothers Sound
|
|-
|1296
|Various Artists
|Voodoo Drums in Hi-Fi
|Authentic ceremonial & street music recorded in Haiti with native musicians & singers 
|-
|1297
|Young Tuxedo Brass Band
|Jazz Begins
|
|-
|1298
|Various Artists
|Historic Jazz Concert at Music Inn
|Featuring Jimmy Giuffre, Teddy Charles, Pee Wee Russell, Dick Katz, Herbie Mann, Oscar Pettiford, Rex Stewart, Ray Brown, George Wein and Connie Kay
|-
|1299
| and Sonny Rollins
|The Modern Jazz Quartet at Music Inn Volume 2
|
|-
|1300
|
|Wilbur de Paris Plays Something Old, New, Gay, Blue
|
|-
|1301
|
|Once in a Blue Moon
|
|-
|1302
|
|The Mad Twenties
|
|-
|1303
|/Joe Thomas
|Mainstream
|
|-
|1304
|
|Fathead
|
|-
|1305
|
|Blues & Roots
|
|-
|1306
| and Charlie Rouse
|The Jazz Modes
|
|-
|1307
|
|Ballads of the Sad Cafe
|
|-
|1308
|
|Late Date with Ruth Brown
|
|-
|1309
|
|Chris Connor Sings the George Gershwin Almanac of Song, Vol. 1
|
|-
|1310
|
|Chris Connor Sings the George Gershwin Almanac of Song, Vol. 2
|
|-
|1311
|
|Giant Steps
|
|-
|1312
|
|The Genius of Ray Charles
|
|-
|1313
|
|Improvised Meditations and Excursions
|
|-
|1314
|
|Piano & Pen
|
|-
|1315
|
|Perpetual Emotion
|
|-
|1316
| and Coleman Hawkins
|Bean Bags
|
|-
|1317
|
|The Shape of Jazz to Come
|
|-
|1318
| & His New New Orleans Jazz
|That's a Plenty
|
|-
|1319
|
|Stringsville
|
|-
|1320
|
|Portrait of the Artist
|
|-
|1321
|
|On the East Side
|
|-
|1322
|
|Merely Marvelous Mabel Mercer
|
|-
|1323
|
|The Legendary Buster Smith
|
|-
|1324
|
|Groove Funk Soul
|
|-
|1325
|
|Pyramid
|
|-
|1326
|
|Win with Irwin
|The World's Foremost Authority Campaigns at the Playboy Club
|-
|1327
|
|Change of the Century
|
|-
|1328
|
|Woody Herman's Big New Herd at the Monterey Jazz Festival
|
|-
|1329
|
|One for Fun
|
|-
|1330
|
|Western Suite
|
|-
|1331
|Newport Jazz Festival All Stars
|Newport Jazz Festival All Stars
|Buck Clayton, Vic Dickenson, Pee Wee Russell, Bud Freeman, George Wein, Champ Jones and Jake Hanna
|-
|1332
|
|Big Joe Rides Again
|
|-
|1333
| & Allan Ganley
|The Jazz Makers
|
|-
|1334
|
|The Golden Striker
|
|-
|1335
|
|Eastern Exposure
|
|-
|1336
|
|The Wild Jazz Age
|Wilbur de Paris Plays Music of the 1920s
|-
|1337
|Various Artists
|The Blues in Modern Jazz
|
|-
|1338
|Various artists
|Jazz at Jazz, Ltd.
|Featuring Bill Reinhardt and Max Hook
|-
|1339
|
|Sister Salvation
|
|-
|1340
|
|Philly Joe's Beat
|
|-
|1341
|
|The Compleat Musician
|
|-
|1342
|
|The Ballad Artistry of Milt Jackson
|
|-
|1343
|
|The Common Ground
|
|-
|1344
|
|Blue and Sentimental
|
|-
|1345
|
|Third Stream Music
|
|-
|1346
|Various Artists
|Southern Folk Heritage Series: Sounds of the South
|
|-
|1347
|Various Artists
|Southern Folk Heritage Series: Blue Ridge Mountain Music
|
|-
|1348
|Various Artists
|Southern Folk Heritage Series: Roots of the Blues
|
|-
|1349
|Various Artists
|Southern Folk Heritage Series: White Spirituals
|
|-
|1350
|Various Artists
|Southern Folk Heritage Series: American Folk Songs for Children
|
|-
|1351
|Various Artists
|Southern Folk Heritage Series: Negro Church Music
|
|-
|1352
|Various Artists
|Southern Folk Heritage Series: The Blues Roll On
|
|-
|1353
|
|This Is Our Music
|
|-
|1354
|
|Coltrane Jazz
|
|-
|1355
|
|A Taste of Honey
|
|-
|1356
|
|More Soul
|
|-
|1357
|
|The New Tristano
|
|-
|1358
|
|Blues Shout
|
|-
|1359
|
|The Modern Jazz Quartet & Orchestra
|
|-
|1360
| and Milt Jackson
|Soul Meeting
|
|-
|1361
|
|My Favorite Things
|
|-
|1362
|
|Somethin' Sanctified
|
|-
|1363
|
|Wilbur DeParis on the Riviera
|
|-
|1364
|
|Free Jazz: A Collective Improvisation
|
|-
|1365
|/Gunther Schuller/Jim Hall
|Jazz Abstractions
|
|-
|1366
|
|Straight Ahead
|
|-
|1367
| & Herbie Mann
|This Is My Beloved
|
|-
|1368
| & John Coltrane
|Bags & Trane
|
|-
|1369
|
|The Genius After Hours
|
|-
|1370
|
|Original Sin
|Music for Ballet
|-
|1371
|
|The Family of Mann
|
|-
|1372
|
|The Soul Clinic
|
|-
|1373
|
|Olé Coltrane
|
|-
|1374
|
|The Catbird Seat
|
|-
|1375
|
|The Wonderful World of Jazz
|
|-
|1376
|Red Mitchell-Harold Land Quintet
|Hear Ye!
|
|-
|1377
|
|Oh Yeah
|
|-
|1378
|
|Ornette!
|
|-
|1379
|
|Jazz with a Twist
|
|-
|1380
|
|Herbie Mann at the Village Gate
|
|-
|1381
|
|Lonely Woman
|
|-
|1382
|
|Coltrane Plays the Blues
|
|-
|1383
|, Chris Connor, Herbie Mann & Bobby Short
|Richard Rodgers' No Strings: An After-Theatre Version
|
|-
|1384
|
|Right Now
|
|-
|1385
|
|European Concert, Vol. 1
|
|-
|1386
|
|European Concert, Vol. 2
|
|-
|1387
|
|From the Heart
|
|-
|1388
|
|A Milanese Story
|Original Soundtrack
|-
|1389
|
|I Don't Worry About a Thing
|
|-
|1390
|
|The Comedy
|
|-
|1391
|
|Feeling + Finesse = Jazz
|
|-
|1392
| & Svend Asmussen
|European Encounter
|
|-
|1393
|
|Suddenly the Blues
|
|-
|1394
|
|Ornette on Tenor
|
|-
|1395
|
|Sonny Stitt & the Top Brass
|
|-
|1396
|
|Explosion! The Sound of Slide Hampton
|
|-
|1397
|
|Do the Bossa Nova with Herbie Mann
|
|-
|1398
|
|Swingin' Machine
|
|-
|1399
|
|Fathead Comes On
|
|-
|1400
|
|Another Dimension
|
|-
|1401
|Kenny Clarke & Francy Boland
|Jazz Is Universal
|
|-
|1402
|, Albert Mangelsdorff & The Zagreb Jazz Quartet
|Animal Dance
|
|-
|1403
|
|Plays the Theme from "Beyond the Fringe" and All That Jazz
|
|-
|1404
|Clarke-Boland Big Band
|Handle with Care
|
|-
|1405
|
|Soul of the Ballad
|
|-
|1406
|
|The Jack Wilson Quartet featuring Roy Ayers
|
|-
|1407
|
|Herbie Mann Returns to the Village Gate
|
|-
|1408
|Eureka Brass Band of New Orleans
|Jazz at Preservation Hall 1
|
|-
|1409
| & De De Pierce/Jim Robinson's New Orleans Band
|Jazz at Preservation Hall 2
|
|-
|1410
| & His Jazz Band/Punch Miller's Bunch & George Lewis
|Jazz at Preservation Hall 3
|
|-
|1411
|George Lewis Band of New Orleans
|Jazz at Preservation Hall 4
|
|-
|1412
| Quartet featuring Jim Hall
|Interaction
|
|-
|1413
|
|Herbie Mann Live at Newport
|
|-
|1414
|
|The Sheriff
|
|-
|1415
|
|Not released
|
|-
|1416
|
|Tonight at Noon
|
|-
|1417
|
|Vibrations
|
|-
|1418
|
|Stitt Plays Bird
|
|-
|1419
|
|Coltrane's Sound
|
|-
|1420
|/Quartetto di Milano/Hungarian Gypsy Quartet
|A Quartet Is a Quartet Is a Quartet
|
|-
|1421
| Quartet featuring Jim Hall
|Live at the Half-Note
|
|-
|1422
|
|Latin Fever
|
|-
|1423
|
|True Blue
|
|-
|1424
|
|The Word from Mose
|
|-
|1425
|
|Essence
|John Lewis Plays the Compositions & Arrangements of Gary McFarland
|-
|1426
| & the Bill Evans Trio
|Nirvana
|
|-
|1427
|
|The Two Sides of Jack Wilson
|
|-
|1428
| & Elvin Jones
|Together!
|
|-
|1429
| with Laurindo Almeida
|Collaboration
|
|-
|1430
| Quartet featuring Jim Hall
|To Sweden With Love
|
|-
|1431
| & Matthew Gee
|Soul Groove
|
|-
|1432
|
|The Laws of Jazz
|
|-
|1433
|
|My Kinda Groove
|
|-
|1434
|
|The Swinger from Rio
|
|-
|1435
|
|The Max Roach Trio featuring the Legendary Hasaan
|
|-
|1436
|
|Dig These Blues
|
|-
|1437
|
|Herbie Mann Plays The Roar of the Greasepaint – The Smell of the Crowd
|
|-
|1438
|
|The Grass Roots
|
|-
|1439
|
|Autobiography
|
|-
|1440
|
|The Modern Jazz Quartet Plays George Gershwin's Porgy and Bess
|
|-
|1441
|
|The New Thing & the Blue Thing
|
|-
|1442
| Quartet
|Sing Me Softly of the Blues
|
|-
|1443
|
|And Then Again
|
|-
|1444
|
|These are My Roots: Clifford Jordan Plays Leadbelly
|
|-
|1445
|
|Standing Ovation at Newport
|
|-
|1446
|
|Soulero
|
|-
|1447
|
|The Fantastic Jazz Harp of Dorothy Ashby
|
|-
|1448
|
|The In Sound
|
|-
|1449
| and the All Star Jazz Band
|Jazz Dialogue
|
|-
|1450
|
|Mose Alive!
|
|-
|1451
| & Don Cherry
|The Avant-Garde
|
|-
|1452
|
|Flute By-Laws
|
|-
|1453
|
|Mean Greens
|
|-
|1454
| 
|Today!
|
|-
|1455
|
|After Hours
|
|-
|1456
|
|Wild Man on the Loose
|
|-
|1457
|
|Jazz for the Jet Set
|
|-
|1458
|
|After This Message
|
|-
|1459
| Quartet
|Dream Weaver
|
|-
|1460
|
|Sayin' Somethin'
|
|-
|1461
|
|Bully!
|
|-
|1462
|
|Monday Night at the Village Gate
|
|-
|1463
|
|A Change Is Gonna Come
|
|-
|1464
|
|Our Mann Flute
|
|-
|1465
|Joe Harriott-John Mayer Double Quintet
|Indo-Jazz Suite
|
|-
|1466
|
|The Great Arrival
|
|-
|1467
|
|Drums Unlimited
|
|-
|1468
|
|Blues at Carnegie Hall
|
|-
|1469
|
|Boss Sounds!
|
|-
|1470
|
|Mr. Blues
|
|-
|1471
|
|New Mann at Newport
|
|-
|1472
|
|Tobacco Road
|
|-
|1473
|
|Forest Flower
|
|-
|1474
|
|Live at Memory Lane
|
|-
|1475
|
|Impressions of the Middle East
|
|-
|1476
|
|Horizons
|
|-
|1477
|
|Backlash
|
|-
|1478
|
|The Tender Storm
|
|-
|1479
|
|Harlem Lullaby
|
|-
|1480
|
|The Beat of Brazil
|
|-
|1481
| Quartet
|Love-In
|
|-
|1482
|Joe Harriott-John Mayer Double Quintet
|Indo-Jazz Fusions
|
|-
|1483
|
|The Beat Goes On
|
|-
|1484
|
|Do It Now!
|
|-
|1485
|Elvin Jones
|Midnight Walk
|
|-
|1486
|
|Live At The Lighthouse
|
|-
|1487
| & His Men
|Jazz Gunn
|
|-
|1488
|
|Virgo Vibes
|
|-
|1489
|
|House Of David
|
|-
|1490
|
|The Herbie Mann String Album
|
|-
|1491
|Jimmy Owens-Kenny Barron Quintet
|You Had Better Listen
|
|-
|1492
|
|People Get Ready
|
|-
|1493
| Quartet
|Journey Within
|
|-
|1494
|
|The Grass Is Greener
|
|-
|1495
|
|The Electrifying Eddie Harris
|
|-
|1496
|
|I Believe to My Soul
|
|-
|1497
|
|The Wailing Dervishes
|
|-
|1498
| & David Newman
|Double Barrelled Soul
|
|-
|1499
|
|The Complete Yusef Lateef
|
|-
|1500
|
|Charles Lloyd in Europe
|
|-
|1501
|
|High Blues Pressure
|
|-
|1502
|
|The Inflated Tear
|
|-
|1503
|
|Double Cross
|
|-
|1504
|
|A Tribute to Courage
|
|-
|1505
|
|Bigger & Better
|
|-
|1506
|
|Plug Me In
|
|-
|1507
|
|Windows Opened
|
|-
|1508
|
|The Blue Yusef Lateef
|
|-
|1509
|
|Laws' Cause
|
|-
|1510
|
|Members, Don't Git Weary
|
|-
|1511
|
|I've Been Doin' Some Thinkin'
|
|-
|1512
| featuring Wayne Henderson 
|Soul Sound System
|
|-
|1513
|
|The Inspiration I Feel
|
|-
|1514
|
|Stoned Soul Picnic
|
|-
|1515
|
|Soul Song
|
|-
|1516
|
|Much Les
|
|-
|1517
|
|Silver Cycles
|
|-
|1518
|
|Left And Right
|
|-
|1519
|
|Soundtrack
|
|-
|1520
|
|Thesaurus
|
|-
|1521
|
|Live at the Top
|Guest Artist: David Newmam
|-
|1522
|
|Memphis Underground
|
|-
|1523
|
|Mr. Blues Plays Lady Soul
|
|-
|1524
|
|The Many Facets of David Newman
|
|-
|1525
|
|Yusef Lateef's Detroit
|
|-
|1526
|
|A Soul Experiment
|
|-
|1527
|
|The Little Giant
|
|-
|1528
|Various Artists
|Jazz Super Hits
|featuring Eddie Harris, John Coltrane, Herbie Mann, Ray Charles and The Modern Jazz Quartet with Laurindo Almeida
|-
|1529:
|
|High Voltage
|
|-
|1530
|
|Right On
|
|-
|1531
|
|Throb
|
|-
|1532
|
|Shirley Scott & the Soul Saxes
|
|-
|1533
|
|George Wein's Newport All Stars
|
|-
|1534
|
|Volunteered Slavery
|
|-
|1535
|
|Jump for Joy
|
|-
|1536
|
|Live at the Whisky a Go Go
|
|-
|1537
| & Eddie Harris
|Swiss Movement
|Recorded Live at The Montreux Jazz Festival, Switzerland
|-
|1538
|
|Daddy Bug
|
|-
|1539
|
|Kings/Queens
|
|-
|1540
|
|Concerto Grosso in D Blues
|
|-
|1541
|
|The Best of John Coltrane
|
|-
|1542
|
|The Best of Mose Allison
|
|-
|1543
|
|The Best of Ray Charles
|
|-
|1544
|
|The Best of Herbie Mann
|
|-
|1545
|
|The Best of Eddie Harris
|
|-
|1546
|
|The Best of The Modern Jazz Quartet
|
|-
|1547
|
|Comment
|
|-
|1548
|
|The Diverse Yusef Lateef
|
|-
|1549
|
|The Black Angel
|
|-
|1550
|
|Hello There, Universe
|
|-
|1551
| & The Enforcers
|Doin' What We Wanna
|
|-
|1552
|
|Over and Over Again
|
|-
|1553
|
|The Coltrane Legacy
|
|-
|1554
|
|Come On Down!
|
|-
|1555
|
|The Best of Charles Mingus
|
|-
|1556
|
|The Best of Charles Lloyd
|
|-
|1557
|
|The Best of Hank Crawford
|
|-
|1558
|
|The Best of Ornette Coleman
|
|-
|1559
|Various Artists
|Jazz Super Hits Vol. 2
|Featuring John Coltrane, Charles Lloyd, Hank Crawford, Ray Charles & David Newman, Herbie Mann, Jack McDuff and Yusef Lateef
|-
|1560
|
|Good Vibes
|
|-
|1561
|
|Something
|
|-
|1562
|
|With a Lotta Help from My Friends
|
|-
|1563
|
|Suite 16
|
|-
|1564
|
|MCMLXX
|
|-
|1565
|
|Burnin'''
|
|-
|1566
| and Will Holt
|The Me Nobody Knows|Original Cast Recording
|-
|1567
|
|Mongo '70|
|-
|1568
|
|Just a Little Lovin
|
|-
|1569
|
|Chapter Two|
|-
|1570
|World's Greatest Jazz Band 
|The World's Greatest Jazz Band of Yank Lawson and Bob Haggart Live|
|-
|1571
|
|Charles Lloyd in the Soviet Union|
|-
|1572
|
|The Art of the Improvisers|
|-
|1573
|
|Free Speech|
|-
|1574
|
|Nobody Else But Me|
|-
|1575
|
|Rahsaan Rahsaan|
|-
|1576
| and İlhan Mimaroğlu
|Sing Me a Song of Songmy|
|-
|1577
| and Keith Jarrett
|Gary Burton & Keith Jarrett|
|-
|1578
|
|Natural Black Inventions: Root Strata|
|-
|1579
|
|Zawinul|
|-
|1580
|
|New Orleans Suite|
|-
|1581
|
|Mongo's Way|
|-
|1582
|World's Greatest Jazz Band of Yank Lawson and Bob Haggart
|What's New?|
|-
|1583
| and Les McCann
|Second Movement|
|-
|1584
|
|Western Man|
|-
|1585
| and The Enforcers
|The Love I've Been Looking For|
|-
|1586
| Quartet
|The Flowering|
|-
|1587
| with the J.C. White Singers
|Lift Every Voice And Sing|
|-
|1588
|
|Twins|
|-
|1589
|
|Plastic Dreams|
|-
|1590
|
|The Best of David Newman|
|-
|1591
|
|The Best of Yusef Lateef|
|-
|1592
|
|The Best of Rahsaan Roland Kirk|
|-
|1593
|
|Mongo at Montreux|
|-
|1594
|
|Quiet Fire|
|-
|1595
|
|Live At Newport|
|-
|1596
|
|The Mourning of a Star|
|-
|1597
| & Stephane Grappelli
|Paris Encounter|
|-
|1598
|
|Alone at Last|
|-
|1599
|
|In the Beginning|Reissue of Presenting Isaac Hayes originally released on the Enterprise label (SD 13-100) 
|-
|1600
|
|Lonely Avenue|
|-
|1601
|
|Blacknuss|
|-
|1602
|
|The Gentle Giant|
|-
|1603
|
|Invitation to Openness|
|-
|1604
|
|Dealing with Hard Times|
|-
|1605
|
|The Don Shirley Point of View|
|-
|1606
|
|Truth Is Fallen|
|-
|1607
|
|The Last Set at Newport|
|-
|1608
|
|Mirror|
|-
|1609
|
|African Cookbook|
|-
|1610
|
|Mississippi Gambler|
|-
|1611
|
|Instant Death|
|-
|1612
|
|Birth|
|-
|1613
|
|The Many Faces of Ragtime|
|-
|1614
|
|Strange Fruit|
|-
|1615
|
|Not released
|
|-
|1616
|
|Not released
|
|-
|1617
| and Ben Webster
|Not released
|
|-
|1618
|
|Not released
|
|-
||1619
|
|Talk to the People|
|-
|1620
|
|The Very Best of Bobby Short|
|-
|1621
|
|Up from the Roots|
|-
|1622
|
|Mountain in the Clouds|
|-
|1623
|
|The Legendary Profile|
|-
|1624
|
|Wild Flower|
|-
|1625
|
|Eddie Harris Sings the Blues|
|-
|1626
|
|Alone at Montreux|
|-
|1627
|
|Mose in Your Ear|
|-
|1628
|
|Doin' It Right Now|
|-
|1629
|
|Movin' On|
|-
|1630
| & Al Hibbler
|A Meeting of the Times|
|-
|1631
|
|Ella Loves Cole|
|-
|1632
|
|Hold On, I'm Coming|
|-
|1633
|
|Gypsy Man|
|-
|1634
|Young-Holt Unlimited
|Oh, Girl|
|-
|1635
|
|Hush 'N' Thunder|
|-
|1636
|
|The New Chicago Blues|
|-
|1637
| & Champion Jack Dupree
|Blues at Montreux|
|-
|1638
|
|The Weapon|
|-
|1639
|Art Ensemble of Chicago
|Bap-Tizum|
|-
|1640
|
|Prepare Thyself to Deal With a Miracle|
|-
|1641
|, Gerry Mulligan and Paul Desmond
|We're All Together Again for the First Time|
|-
|1642
|
|Turtle Bay|
|-
|1643
|
|Svengali|
|-
|1644
|
|Terra Nova|
|-
|1645
|
|Two Generations of Brubeck|
|-
|1646
|
|Layers|
|-
|1647
|
|E.H. in the U.K.|
|-
|1648
|
|London Underground|
|-
|1649
|
|Brother, Where Are You?|
|-
|1650
|
|Part of the Search|
|-
|1651
|Art Ensemble of Chicago
|Fanfare for the Warriors|
|-
|1652
|
|Blues on Bach|
|-
|1653
|
|Mingus Moves|
|-
|1654
|
|Experience and Judgment|
|-
|1655
|
|Reggae|
|-
|1656
|
|Stompin' at the Savoy|
|-
|1657
|
|Raw Root|
|-
|1658
|
|First Light|
|-
|1659
|
|Is It In|
|-
|1660
|
|Brother, The Great Spirit Made Us All|
|-
|1661
|
|Journey|
|-
|1662
|
|Newmanism|
|-
|1663
|
|Free Fall|
|-
|1664
|
|The Mad Twenties|
|-
|1665
|
|Recollections of the Big Band Era|
|-
|1666
|
|Another Beginning|
|-
|1667
|
|Mingus at Carnegie Hall|
|-
|1668
|
|Alternate Takes|
|-
|1669
|
|I Need Some Money|
|-
|1670
|
|Discothèque|
|-
|1671
| with The New York Jazz Repertory Company
|Satchmo Remembered: The Music of Louis Armstrong at Carnegie Hall|
|-
|1672
|
|Solo Piano|
|-
|1673
|
|El Juicio (The Judgement)|
|-
|1674
|
|The Case of the 3 Sided Dream in Audio Color|
|-
|1675
|
|Bad Luck Is All I Have|
|-
|1676
|
|Waterbed|
|-
|1677
|
|Changes One|
|-
|1678
|
|Changes Two|
|-
|1679
|
|Hustle to Survive|
|-
|1680
|
|Confessin' the Blues|
|-
|1681
|
|Rhyme and Reason|
|-
|1682
|
|Surprises|Featuring Cissy Houston
|-
|1683
|
|That Is Why You're Overweight|
|-
|1684
|
|All The Things We Are|With Anthony Braxton, Alan Dawson, Roy Haynes, Lee Konitz and Jack Six
|-
|1685
|
|The Doctor Is In... and Out|
|-
|1686
|
|Other Folks' Music|
|-
|1687
|
|Echoes of Blue|Compilation of tracks from the albums Backlash and High Blues Pressure.
|-
|1688
|
|Duke Ellington's Jazz Violin Session|With Svend Asmussen, Stephane Grappelli and Ray Nance
|-
|1689
|
|My Personal Property|
|-
|1690
|
|River High, River Low|
|-
|1691
|
|Your Mind Is on Vacation|
|-
|1692
|
|Daddy Bug & Friends|
|-
|1693
|
|Jazz Gala Concert|
|-
|1694
|
|Concerto Retitled|Compilation of tracks from The Rise and Fall of the Third Stream, Zawinul and Money in the Pocket|-
|1695
|
|Springfever|
|-
|1696
|/Herbie Hancock/Keith Jarrett/McCoy Tyner
|Chick Corea – Herbie Hancock – Keith Jarrett – McCoy Tyner|
|-
|1697
|Not used
|
|
|-
|1698
|
|How Can You Live Like That?|
|-
|1699
|
|Tomorrow's Promises|
|-
|1700
|
|Three or Four Shades of Blues|
|-
|8800
|
|The Last of the Blue Devils|
|-
|8801
|
|Cumbia & Jazz Fusion|
|-
|8802
|
|Montreux Concert|
|-
|8803
|
|Me, Myself An Eye|
|-
|8804
| 
|The Big Apple Bash|
|-
|8805
|
|Something Like a Bird|
|-
|8806
|
|More from the Last Concert|
|}
Atlantic Records Catalog: 1200 series – album index, accessed September 4, 2015

3000 "Jazz" Series
A small run of eight jazz LPs were released between 1965 and 1967 as the 3000 Series.Atlantic Records Catalog: 8800, 3000 series, accessed September 25, 2015

8000 "Popular" Series
Atlantic commenced releasing 12-inch LPs of popular music in 1956 with the 8000 Series collections of hit singles by their roster of established rhythm and blues artists. The 1960s saw the expansion of Atlantic's roster with the addition of popular music performers, international artists and the emerging dominance of soul music singers such as Solomon Burke and Aretha Franklin. By the end of the 1960s the label experienced its greatest commercial success breaking rock music supergroups like Led Zeppelin and Crosby, Stills & Nash.
{| class="wikitable sortable"
|-
! Catalog
! Artist
! Album
! Notes
|-
|8001
|Various Artists
|The Greatest Rock & Roll|Featuring LaVern Baker, Ruth Brown, Ray Charles, The Clovers, The Drifters, Ivory Joe Hunter, Clyde McPhatter, Joe Turner and Chuck Willis
|-
|8002
|
|LaVern|
|-
|8003
| and The Drifters
|Clyde McPhatter and The Drifters|Rock & Roll Series
|-
|8004
|
|Ruth Brown|Rock & Roll Series
|-
|8005
|
|Joe Turner|Rock & Roll Series
|-
|8006
|
|Ray Charles|Rock & Roll Series
|-
|8007
|
|LaVern Baker|Rock & Roll Series
|-
|8008
|
|Ivory Joe Hunter|Rock & Roll Series
|-
|8009
|
|The Clovers|
|-
|8010
|Various Artists
|Rock & Roll Forever|Featuring Joe Turner, LaVern Baker, The Clovers, Clyde McPhatter & The Drifters, Ray Charles, Ruth Brown and T-Bone Walker
|-
|8011
| and His Orchestra
|Hi-Fi Sounds for Young Parisians|
|-
|8012
|Mac-Kac
|Mac-Kac & His French Rock & Roll|
|-
|8013
|Various Artists
|Dance the Rock & Roll|Featuring Willis Jackson, Chuck Calhoun, Tommy Ridgley, Arnett Cobb, Joe Morris, Frank Culley and Tiny Grimes
|-
|8014
|
|I Miss You So|
|-
|8015
|
|Ivory Joe Sings the Old and the New|
|-
|8016
|
|Cy Walter Plays Gershwin Classics|
|-
|8017
|
|Betty Johnson|
|-
|8018 
|
|The King of the Stroll|
|-
|8019
|
|Blues from the Gutter|
|-
|8020
|
|T-Bone Blues|
|-
|8021
|Various Artists
|Rock & Roll Forever Vol II|Featuring Chuck Willis, Ray Charles, The Bobbettes, Joe Turner, LaVern Baker, Clyde McPhatter, Ruth Brown, Ivory Joe Hunter, The Clovers, The Drifters and The Jaye Sisters 
|-
|8022
|
|Rockin' & Driftin'|
|-
|8023
|
|Rockin' the Blues|
|-
|8024
|
|Love Ballads|
|-
|8025
|
|Yes Indeed!|
|-
|8026
|
|Miss Rhythm|
|-
|8027
|
|The Song You Heard When You Fell In Love|
|-
|8028
|
|¡Amor!: The Fabulous Guitar of Luiz Bonfa|
|-
|8029
|
|What'd I Say|
|-
|8030
|
|Blues Ballads|
|-
|8031
|
|Clyde|
|-
|8032
|
|Witchcraft|
|-
|8033
|
|Big Joe is Here|
|-
|8034
|
|The Clovers' Dance Party|
|-
|8035
|
|The Wildest Guitar|
|-
|8036
|
|Precious Memories: LaVern Baker Sings Gospel|
|-
|8037
|Various Artists
|The Rocking 50s|Featuring LaVern Baker, The Bobettes, Ruth Brown, Ray Charles, The Clovers, The Drifters, Ivory Joe Hunter, Clyde McPhatter, Joe Turner and Chuck Willis
|-
|8038
|
|Skiffle Folk Music|
|-
|8039
|
|Ray Charles in Person|
|-
|8040
|
|Chris in Person|
|-
|8041
|
|The Drifters' Greatest Hits|
|-
|8042
|
|Tell the World About This|
|-
|8043
|
|Makin' the Scene|
|-
|8044
| and His Continental Dance Orchestra
|Romantica|
|-
|8045
|
|Natural & Soulful Blues|
|-
|8046
|
|A Portrait of Chris|
|-
|8047
|
|Yakety Yak|
|-
|8048
|
|Fun Life|
|-
|8049
| and Maynard Ferguson
|Double Exposure|
|-
|8050
|
|Saved|
|-
|8051
| and Dolly Jonah
|On the Brink|
|-
|8052
| 
|The Genius Sings the Blues|
|-
|8053
|
|Robert Clary Lives It Up at the Playboy Club|
|-
|8054
|
|Do the Twist! with Ray Charles|
|-
|8055
|
|Last Night!|
|-
|8056
|
|Champion of the Blues|
|-
|8057
|
|Gee Whiz|
|-
|8058
|Various Artists
|The Greatest Twist Hits|Featuring LaVern Baker, The Bobettes, Solomon Burke, Ray Charles, The Clovers, King Coleman, King Curtis, The Mar-Keys, Clyde McPhatter, Tommy Ridgley, Lloyd Sims, The Top Notes, Tee Tucker and Big Joe Turner
|-
|8059
|
|Save the Last Dance for Me|
|-
|8060
| & His Commanders
|Twist Party at the Roundtable|
|-
|8061
|
|Free Spirits|
|-
|8062:
|
|Do the Pop-Eye with the Mar-Keys|
|-
|8063
|
|The Ray Charles Story Volume One|
|-
|8064
|
|The Ray Charles Story Volume Two|
|-
|8065
|Various Artists
|The Solid Gold Groups|
|-
|8066
|
|Mel Tormé at the Red Hill|
|-
|8067
|
|Solomon Burke's Greatest Hits|
|-
|8068
|Various Artists
|Hound Dog's Old Gold|
|-
|8069
|
|Comin' Home Baby!|
|-
|8070
|
|The Boss of the Bossa Nova|US release of João Gilberto (Odeon, 1961)
|-
|8071
|
|See See Rider|
|-
|8072
|
|Inside Folk Songs|
|-
|8073
|
| Up on the Roof: The Best of the Drifters|
|-
|8074
|
|He's In Charge Here!|
|-
|8075
|
|You Never Know|
|-
|8076
|
|The Warm World of Joao Gilberto|US release of Chega de Saudade (Odeon, 1959)
|-
|8077
|
|The Best of Clyde McPhatter|
|-
|8078
|
|The Best of LaVern Baker|
|-
|8079
|
|I Remember Chuck Willis|
|-
|8080
|
|The Best of Ruth Brown|
|-
|8081
|
|The Best of Joe Turner|
|-
|8082
|
|The Best of Chris Connor|
|-
|8083
|
|The Ray Charles Story Vol. 3|
|-
|8084
|
|Out of the Shadows|US release of UK LP (Columbia, 1962)
|-
|8085
|
|If You Need Me|
|-
|8086
|
|Hello Stranger|
|-
|8087
|
|The New World Singers|
|-
|8088
|
|Doris Troy Sings Just One Look|
|-
|8089
|
|Surfin' with the Shadows|
|-
|8090
|
|Snap Your Fingers|Subtitled Barbara Lewis Sings the Great Soul Tunes 
|-
|8091
|
|Mel Tormé Sings Sunday in New York|
|-
|8092
|Anamari
|Anamari|
|-
|8093
|
|Our Biggest Hits|Discontinued after a very short time in favor of 8099
|-
|8094
|
|The Ray Charles Story Volume 4|
|-
|8095
|
|The Complete Life of General Douglas MacArthur Through His Own Words|
|-
|8096
|
|Rock 'n' Soul|
|-
|8097
|
|The Shadows Know!!!|
|-
|8098
|Various Artists
|Jamaica Ska|Featuring Byron Lee & the Ska Kings, The Blues Busters, The Charmers, Stranger, Ken & Patsy and The Maytals
|-
|8099
|
|Under the Boardwalk|
|-
|8100
|Various Artists
|Porky's Golden Dusties|Featuring The Robins, The Penguins, The Falcons, The Nite Caps, The Aladdins, The Avalons, The Superiors, Jimmy McHugh, Tony March, The Coasters, The Swingin' Hearts, Larry Dale, The Caps, The Versatones, The Clovers, The Royaltones, Clyde McPhatter, Ronnie Jones & The Classmates, The Dubs and The Blonde Bomber
|-
|8101
|Various Artists
|Saturday Night at the Uptown|Live album recorded at The Uptown Theatre in Philadelphia featuring The Drifters, Wilson Pickett, The Vibrations, Patty & the Emblems, The Carltons, Barbara Lynn and Patti LaBelle & Her Bluebells
|-
|8102
|
|And I Love Him!|
|-
|8103
|
|The Good Life with the Drifters|
|-
|8104
|
|Mercy!|
|-
|8105
| & João Gilberto
|Herbie Mann & Joao Gilberto with Antonio Carlos Jobim|
|-
|8106
|
|Hold On To What You've Got|
|-
|8107
|
|Austin Cromer Sings for Her|
|-
|8108
|
|Killer Joe's International Discothèque|
|-
|8109
|
|The Best of Solomon Burke|
|-
|8110
|
|Baby, I'm Yours|
|-
|8111
| and Clarence Pettiford
|Chiles & Pettiford Live at Jilly's|
|-
|8112
| and Brasil '65
|In Person at El Matador|
|-
|8113
|
|Where The Music's Playing|
|-
|8114
|
|In the Midnight Hour|
|-
|8115
|
|The New Boss|
|-
|8116
|Various Artists
|Solid Gold Soul|Featuring  Solomon Burke, Don Covay, Ben E. King, Wilson Pickett, Otis Redding and Joe Tex 
|-
|8117
|
|Land of 1000 Dances|
|-
|8118
|
|It's Magic|
|-
|8119
| and The Bluebelles
|Over the Rainbow|
|-
|8120
|
|See-Saw|
|-
|8121
|
|Bobby Darin Sings The Shadow of Your Smile|
|-
|8122
|
|Esther Phillips Sings|
|-
|8123
|
|The Young Rascals|
|-
|8124
|
|The Love You Save|
|-
|8125
|
|When a Man Loves a Woman|
|-
|8126
|
|In a Broadway Bag|
|-
|8127
|
|Fabulous New French Singing Star|
|-
|8128
|
|A Time to Love|
|-
|8129
|
|The Exciting Wilson Pickett|
|-
|8130
|
|The Country Side of Esther Phillips|
|-
|8131
|Not released
|
|
|-
|8132
|
|Warm and Tender Soul|
|-
|8133
|
|I've Got to Do a Little Bit Better|
|-
|8134
|
|Collections|
|-
|8135
|
|If I Were a Carpenter|
|-
|8136
|
|The Piano of Eddie Higgins|
|-
|8137
|Various Artists
|Solid Gold Soul Volume 2|Featuring Solomon Burke, Ray Charles, Chris Kenner, Wilson Pickett, Percy Sledge and Joe Tex
|-
|8138
|
|The Wicket Pickett|
|-
|8139
|
|I Never Loved a Man the Way I Love You|
|-
|8140
|Various Artists
|Beach Beat|Featuring The Clovers, The Coasters, The Drifters, Barbara Lewis, Stick McGhee, Clyde McPhatter, Willie Tee, Doris Troy and Chuck Willis
|-
|8141
| & Tamiko Jones
|A Mann & A Woman|
|-
|8142
|
|Inside Out|
|-
|8143
|
|For Once in My Life|
|-
|8144
|
|The Best of Joe Tex|
|-
|8145
|
|The Sound of Wilson Pickett|
|-
|8146
|
|The Percy Sledge Way|
|-
|8147
| & The Bluebelles
|Dreamer|
|-
|8148
|
|Groovin'|
|-
|8149
|
|Cowboys & Colored People|
|-
|8150
|
|Aretha Arrives|
|-
|8151
|
|The Best of Wilson Pickett|
|-
|8152
|
|I Can Tell|
|-
|8153
|
|The Drifters' Golden Hits|
|-
|8154
|
|Bobby Darin Sings Doctor Dolittle|
|-
|8155
|
|The Sweet Inspirations|
|-
|8156
|
|Live and Lively|
|-
|8157
|
|Daktari|
|-
|8158
|
|King Solomon|
|-
|8159
| & Gail Parent
|Here Comes the Bird|
|-
|8160
|
|Made in France|
|-
|8161
|Various Artists
|History of Rhythm & Blues Volume 1: The Roots 1947–52|Featuring Ruth Brown, The Cardinals, The Clovers, Frank Culley, The Delta Rhythm Boys, Lead Belly, Stick McGhee, Edna McGriff, The Orioles, The Ravens, Laurie Tate & Joe Morris Orchestra and Joe Turner
|-
|8162
|Various Artists
|History of Rhythm & Blues Volume 2: The Golden Years 1953–55|Featuring LaVern Baker, Ruth Brown, Ray Charles, The Chords, The Clovers, The Diamonds, The Drifters featuring Clyde McPhatter, The Five Keys, Tommy Ridgeley and Joe Turner  
|-
|8163
|Various Artists
|History of Rhythm & Blues Volume 3: Rock & Roll 1956–57|Featuring The Robins, The Clovers, Joe Turner, The Drifters, Clyde McPhatter, Ivory Joe Hunter, LaVern Baker, The Coasters and Chuck Willis
|-
|8164
|Various Artists
|History of Rhythm & Blues Volume 4: The Big Beat 1958–60|Featuring LaVern Baker, Ray Charles, The Coasters, Bobby Darin, The Drifters, Ben E. King, Clyde McPhatter and Carla Thomas
|-
|8165
|
|Portrait of Carmen|
|-
|8166
|
|Latin Bugalu|
|-
|8167
|Various Artists
|Brazil's Super Hits|Featuring Luiz Bonfa, João Gilberto, Herbie Mann, Sergio Mendes, The Modern Jazz Quartet with Laurindo Almeida, and Baden Powell
|-
|8169
|
|Once Upon a Dream|
|-
|8170
|Various Artists
|This Is Soul|Featuring Solomon Burke, Arthur Conley, Eddie Floyd, Aretha Franklin, Ben E. King, Wilson Pickett, Otis Redding, Sam & Dave, Percy Sledge and Carla Thomas	
|-
|8171
|
|Here Is Barbara Lynn|
|-
|8172
|
|Love Songs|featuring Billy Taylor
|-
|8173
|
|Workin' on a Groovy Thing|
|-
|8174
| & Judy Clay
|Storybook Children|
|-
|8175
|
|I'm in Love|
|-
|8176
|
|Lady Soul|
|-
|8177
|
|Sérgio Mendes' Favorite Things|
|-
|8178
| and George Foster 
|The Handwriting on the Wall|Subtitled The Sounds of Graffiti|-
|8179
|
|You Devil You|
|-
|8180
|
|Take Time to Know Her|
|-
|8181
|
|Tighten Up|
|-
|8182
|
|Songs of Faith & Inspiration|Credited to Cissy Drinkard & The Sweet Inspirations
|-
|8183
|
|The Midnight Mover|
|-
|8184
|Mandala
|Soul Crusade|
|-
|8185
|
|I Wish I Knew|
|-
|8186
|
|Aretha Now|
|-
|8187
|
|Soul Country|
|-
|8188
|Various Artists
|The Super Hits Vol. 2|Featuring The Bar-Kays, Bee Gees, Buffalo Springfield, Don Covay, The Fireballs, Aretha Franklin, Wilson Pickett, The Rascals, Otis Redding, Sam & Dave, Sonny & Cher and Joe Tex 
|-
|8189
|Apple Pie Motherhood Band
|The Apple Pie Motherhood Band|
|-
|8190
|
|Time Peace: The Rascals' Greatest Hits|
|-
|8191
|Various Artists
|Beach Beat Vol. 2|Featuring Bobby Moore & the Rhythm Aces, Tony Clarke, The Clovers, The Coasters, King Curtis & The Kingpins, Ben E. King, Barbara Lewis, Clyde McPhatter, Lenny O'Henry, Billy Stewart, Willie Tee and Maurice Williams and the Zodiacs
|-
|8192
|
|This Is Clarence Carter|
|-
|8193
|Various Artists
|History of Rhythm & Blues Volume 5: The Beat Goes On 1961–62|Featuring LaVern Baker, William Bell, Booker T. & the M.G.'s, Solomon Burke, Ray Charles, The Coasters, The Drifters, The Falcons featuring Wilson Pickett, The Ikettes, Ben E. King, The Mar-Keys, Otis Redding and Rufus Thomas
|-
|8194
|Various Artists
|History of Rhythm & Blues Volume 6: On Broadway 1963–64|Featuring Solomon Burke, The Coasters, Don Covay, The Drifters, Nat Kendrick & The Swans, Chris Kenner, Ben E. King, Barbara Lewis, Wilson Pickett, Otis Redding, Joe Tex, Carla Thomas, Rufus Thomas and Doris Troy
|-
|8195
|
|The Robert Stigwood Orchestra Plays Bee Gees' Hits|
|-
|8196
|
|What Is an Uggams?|
|-
|8197
|
|With Pen in Hand|
|-
|8198
|
|The Crazy World of Arthur Brown|US release of UK album
|-
|8199
|
|The Dynamic Clarence Carter|
|-
|8200
|
|The Sound of Silence|
|-
|8201
| 
|What the World Needs Now Is Love|
|-
|8202
|Booker T. & the M.G.'s
|The Best of Booker T. and the MG's|
|-
|8203
|Various Artists
|The Super Hits Vol. 3|Featuring Archie Bell & the Drells, Booker T. & the MG's, Arthur Conley, Cream, Aretha Franklin, Wilson Pickett, The Rascals, Sam & Dave, Percy Sledge, The Sweet Inspirations and Vanilla Fudge
|-
|8204
| & the Drells
|I Can't Stop Dancing|
|-
|8205
|Sam & Dave
|I Thank You|
|-
|8206
|
|Sooner or Later|
|-
|8207
|
|Aretha in Paris|
|-
|8208
|Various Artists
|History of Rhythm & Blues Volume 7: The Sound of Soul 1965-66|Featuring Solomon Burke, The Capitols, Don Covay & The Goodtimers, Eddie Floyd, Barbara Lewis, Wilson Pickett, Otis Redding, Sam & Dave, Percy Sledge and Willie Tee
|-
|8209
|Various Artists
|History of Rhythm & Blues Volume 8: The Memphis Sound 1967|Featuring The Bar-Kays, Booker T. & the MG's, Arthur Conley, King Curtis, Aretha Franklin, Wilson Pickett, Otis Redding, Sam & Dave, Percy Sledge, Joe Tex and Carla Thomas
|-
|8210
|
|The Best of Percy Sledge|
|-
|8211
|
|Happy Soul|
|-
|8212
|
|Soul '69|
|-
|8213
|
|King of the Blues Guitar|
|-
|8214
|
|Dusty in Memphis 
|
|-
|8215
|
|Hey Jude|
|-
|8216
|Led Zeppelin
|Led Zeppelin|
|-
|8217
|
|Shame Shame|
|-
|8218
|Sam & Dave
|The Best of Sam & Dave|
|-
|8219
|Cartoone
|Cartoone|
|-
|8220
|Black Pearl
|Black Pearl|
|-
|8221
|Ars Nova
|Sunshine and Shadows|
|-
|8222
|
|Glass Onion|
|-
|8223
|
|Motor-Cycle|
|-
|8224
|Various Artists
|The Super Hits Vol. 4|Featuring Bee Gees, Archie Bell & The Drells, Arthur Brown, Clarence Carter, Cream, Tyrone Davis, Aretha Franklin, Wilson Pickett, The Rascals and Dusty Springfield
|-
|8225
| 
|Sweets for My Sweet|
|-
|8226
| & the Drells
|There's Gonna Be a Showdown|
|-
|8227
|
|Aretha's Gold|
|-
|8228
|
|The New Message|
|-
|8229
|Crosby, Stills & Nash
|Crosby, Stills & Nash|
|-
|8230
|
|First Take|
|-
|8231
|
|Buying a Book|
|-
|8232
|
|The Best of Carla Thomas|
|-
|8233
|Apple Pie Motherhood Band
|Apple Pie|
|-
|8234
|
|Rune at the Top|
|-
|8235
|
|Hair is Beautiful|
|-
|8236
|Led Zeppelin
|Led Zeppelin II|
|-
|8237
| & the Jefferson Lemon Blues Band
|The House of Blue Lights|
|-
|8238
|
|Testifin 
|
|-
|8239
|Boz Scaggs
|Boz Scaggs
|
|-
|8240
|Banchee
|Banchee
|
|-
|8241
|
|Just to Satisfy You
|
|-
|8242
|
|The Source
|
|-
|8243
|Yes
|Yes
|
|-
|8244
|Golden Earring
|Eight Miles High
|
|-
|8245
|King Crimson
|In the Court of the Crimson King
|
|-
|8246
|
|See
|
|-
|8247
|MC5
|Back in the USA
|
|-
|8248
|
|This Girl's in Love with You
|
|-
|8249
|
|A Brand New Me
|
|-
|8250
|
|Right On
|
|-
|8251
|
|Southern Fried
|
|-
|8252
|
|Feelin' Alright
|
|-
|8253
|
|Sweet, Sweet Soul
|
|-
|8254
|
|Joe Tex Sings with Strings & Things
|
|-
|8255
|
|Blues from the Gutter
|Reissue of 8019
|-
|8256
|
|T-Bone Blues
|Reissue of 8020
|-
|8257
|
|Inside Shel Silverstein
|Reissue of 8072
|-
|8258
|Mott the Hoople
|Mott the Hoople
|
|-
|8259
|
|Outlaw
|
|-
|8260
|
|Loudon Wainwright III
|
|-
|8261
|Side Show
|Side Show
|
|-
|8262
|
|The Assembled Multitude
|
|-
|8263
|Tamalpais Exchange
|Tamalpais Exchange
|
|-
|8264
|Thunderclap Newman
|Hollywood Dream
|
|-
|8265
|
|Spirit in the Dark
|
|-
|8266
|King Crimson
|In the Wake of Poseidon
|
|-
|8267
|
|Patches
|
|-
|8268
|
|Someday Soon
|
|-
|8269
|Jo Mama
|Jo Mama
|
|-
|8270
|
| Wilson Pickett In Philadelphia
|
|-
|8271
|
|Sam, Hard and Heavy
|
|-
|8272
|Mott the Hoople
|Mad Shadows 
|
|-
|8273
|Yes
|Time and a Word
|
|-
|8274
|Various Artists
|The Super Hits Volume 5
|Featuring Brook Benton, Blues Image, Crosby, Stills, Nash & Young, Tyrone Davis, Aretha Franklin, R. B. Greaves, Led Zeppelin, Lulu, Nazz, Wilson Pickett, The Rascals and Thunderclap Newman
|-
|8275
|
|The J. Geils Band 
|
|-
|8276
|
|Search and Nearness
|
|-
|8277
| & the Gang
|Peace Sing-Along
|
|-
|8278
|King Crimson
|Lizard
|
|-
|8279
|Alamo
|Alamo
|
|-
|8280
|Papa Nebo
|Papa Nebo
|
|-
|8281
|
|Headless Heroes of the Apocalypse
|
|-
|8282
|
|The Best of Clarence Carter
|
|-
|8283
|Yes
|The Yes Album
|
|-
|8284
|Mott the Hoople
|Wildlife
|
|-
|8285
|MC5
|High Time
|
|-
|8286
|
|The Best of Barbara Lewis
|
|-
|8287
|
|Unreleased album
|later surfaced as extra tracks on the CD issue of Confessin' The Blues.
|-
|8288
|Jo Mama 
|J is for Jump
|
|-
|8289
|
|Standing Here Wondering Which Way
|
|-
|8290
|
|The Best of Wilson Pickett, Volume 2
|
|-
|8291
|
|Album II
|
|-
|8292
|
|From the Roots Came the Rapper
|
|-
|8293
|
|Judee Sill
|Not released on Atlantic; this was instead issued as the first album released on Asylum Records.
|-
|8294
|
|Charles John Quarto
|
|-
|8295
|
|Aretha's Greatest Hits
|
|-
|8296
|
|John Prine
|
|-
|8297
|
|The Morning After
|
|-
|8298
|Batdorf & Rodney
|Off the Shelf
|
|-
|8299
|
|Dixie Fried
|
|-
|8300
|
|Don't Knock My Love
|
|-
|8301
| Jimmy & Vella
|Jimmy and Vella
|
|-
|8302
| Shanti
|Shanti
|
|-
|8303
|
|Howard Tate
|
|-
|8304
|Mott the Hoople
|Brain Capers
|
|-
|8305
|
|The Best of Aretha Franklin
|
|}
Edwards, D., Eyries, P. & Callahan, M., Both Sides Now,  Atlantic Album Discography, Part 5: 8000 Series (1968-1972), accessed September 22, 2015

7200-7311
SD-7200 – Déjà Vu – Crosby, Stills, Nash and Young [1970]
SD-7201 – Led Zeppelin III – Led Zeppelin [1970]
SD-7202 – Stephen Stills – Stephen Stills [1970] 
SD-7203 – If I Could Only Remember My Name – David Crosby [1971]
SD-7204 – Songs For Beginners – Graham Nash [1971]
SD-7205 – Live At Fillmore West – Aretha Franklin [1971]
SD-7206 – Stephen Stills 2 – Stephen Stills [1971] 
SD-7207 – Soul To Soul – Various Artists [1971]
SD-7208 – Led Zeppelin IV (Untitled) – Led Zeppelin [1971]
SD-7209 – The Way to Become the Sensuous Woman By "J" – Tony Camillo [1971]
SD-7210 – All In the Family (TV Soundtrack) – Carroll O'Connor and Others [1971]
SD-7211 – Fragile – Yes [1971]
SD-7212 – Islands – King Crimson [1972]
SD-7213 – Young, Gifted and Black – Aretha Franklin [1972] 
LD-7214 – FM and AM – George Carlin [1972] The label on this album is Little David Records. 
SD-7215 – Good Ol' Boys – Harold Griffiths [1/72]
SD-7216 – Roberta Flack and Donny Hathaway – Roberta Flack and Donny Hathaway [1972]
SP 7217 – Softly Whispering I Love You – The English Congregation [1972] Issued with a Signpost label and a different prefix. This group is known in the UK as "The Congregation".
SD-7218 – Rollin' Man – Bobby Lance [1972]
SD-7219 – Take a Sad Song... – Godfrey Daniel [1972] 
SD-7220 – Graham Nash and David Crosby – Graham Nash and David Crosby [1972]
SD-7221 – Donal Leace – Donal Leace [11/72]
SD-7222 – David Elliot – David Elliot [10/72]
SD-7223 – Neal Rosengarden – Neal Rosengarden [1972]
SD-7224 – Atlanta Twelve String – Blind Willie McTell [1972] 
SD-7225 – New Orleans Piano – Professor Longhair [1972]
SD-7226 – Texas Guitar: From Dallas To L.A. – Various Artists [1972] 
SD-7227 – Blues Piano: Chicago Plus – Various Artists [1972]
SD-7228 – Detroit Guitar – John Lee Hooker [1972] 
SD-7229 – Chicago Piano, Volume One – Jimmy and Mama Yancey [1972]
SD-7230 – Keyboard Tales – Michael Perlitch [1972]
SD-7231 – Jackie – Jackie DeShannon [1972] 
SD-7232 – All In the Family Second Album (TV Soundtrack) – Carroll O'Connor and Others [1972]
SD-7233 – Angelo – Angelo [1972]
SD-7234 – Macondo – Macondo [1972]
SD-7235 – The Ship Album – S.C.R.A. (Southern Contemporary Rock Assembly) [1972]
SD-7236 – Ramatam – Ramatam [1972]
SD-7237 – Black Heat – Black Heat [1972] 
SD-7238 – The Divine Miss M – Bette Midler [1972]
SD-7239 - (Untitled) - Clyde McPhatter [unreleased]
SD-7240 – Diamond In the Rough – John Prine [1972]
SD-7241 – Full House – J. Geils Band [1972]
SD-7242 – Whole Oats – Daryl Hall and John Oates [1972]
SD-7243 – Good God – Good God [1972]
SD-7244 – Close To the Edge – Yes [1972]
SD-7245 – Margaret and Ann – Margaret & Ann [1972]
SD-7246 – If You're Lonely – Eric Justin Kaz [12/72]
SD-7247 – New Heavenly Blue – New Heavenly Blue [1972]
SD-7248 – Margie Joseph – Margie Joseph [1972]
SD-7249 – Laugh When You Like – Jerry Stiller and Anne Meara [1972]
SD-7250 – Down the Road – Stephen Stills and Manassas [1973]
SD-7251 – Cosmic Furnace – Roger Powell [2/73]
SD-7252 – You're a Good Man Charlie Brown – TV Soundtrack [1972]
SD-7253 – Garland Jefferys – Garland Jefferys [1973]
SD-7254 – Doug Sahm and Band – Doug Sahm [1973] 
SD-7255 – Houses of the Holy – Led Zeppelin [1973]
SD-7256 – Spinners – Spinners [1973]
SD-7257 – First Rush – Chris Rush [4/73]
SD-7258 – A View From Another Place – Wayne Davis [1973]
SD-7259 – River – Terry Reid [1973]
SD-7260 – Bloodshot – J. Geils Band [1973] First pressings were on crimson vinyl, later pressings on black vinyl. 
SD-7261 – In April Cae the Dawning of the Red Suns – Ramatam [1973] 
SD-7262 – Shotgun Willie – Willie Nelson [1973] 
SD-7263 – Larks' Tongues In Aspic – King Crimson [1973] 
SD-7264 – Breezy Stories – Danny O'Keefe [1973] 
SD-7265 – Hey Now Hey (The Other Side of the Sky) – Aretha Franklin [1973]
SD-7266 – Just Thank Me – David Rogers [1973]
SD-7267 – Soul Makossa – Manu Dibango [1973]
SD-7268 – Spectrum – Billy Cobham [1973]
SD-7269 – Abandoned Luncheonette – Daryl Hall and John Oates [1973]
SD-7270 – Bette Midler – Bette Midler [11/73]
SD-7271 – Killing Me Softly – Roberta Flack [8/73]
SD-7272 - (Untitled) - Macondo [unreleased]
SD-7273 – Room To Grow – Barnaby Bye [1973]
SD-7274 – Sweet Revenge – John Prine [1973]
SD-7275 – Troublemaker – Willie Nelson [3/74]
SD-7276 – Makossa Man – Manu Dibango [1974]
SD-7277 – Sweet Surrender – Margie Joseph [1974] 
SD-7278 – Ms. Brown – Marti Brown [1974]
SD-7279 – This Is Henson Cargill Country – Henson Cargill [1973]
SD-7280 – On His Way – Don Adams [1973]
SD-7281 – Now Presenting – Troy Seals [1973]
SD-7282 – Anybody Seen My Sweet Gypsy Rose – Terry Stafford [1973] This album contains the original recording of "Amarillo by Morning," which later was a huge country hit by George Strait.
SD-7283 – Farewell To the Ryman – David Rogers [1974]
SD-7284 – Best of Crosby, Stills, Nash and Young – Crosby, Stills, Nash and Young [Unissued?]
SD-7285 – Sweet Charlie Babe – Jackie Moore [1974]
SD-7286 – Ladies Invited – J. Geils Band [11/73]
SD-7287 – Texas Tornado – Sir Douglas Band [12/73] 
SD-7288 – Wild Tales – Graham Nash [1973] 
SD-7289 – One More River To Cross – Canned Heat [12/73] 
SD-7290 – Cul-De-Sac – Eric Kaz [3/74]
SD-7291 – Phases and Stages – Willie Nelson [1974]
SD-7292 – Let Me In Your Life – Aretha Franklin [1974]
SD-7293 – Queen of the Night – Maggie Bell [1974]
SD-7294 – No Time To Burn – Black Heat [1974]
SD-7295 – What the....You Mean I Can't Sing?! – Melvin Van Peebles [1974]
SD-7296 – Mighty Love – Spinners [1974]
SD-7297 – Rock and Roll Queen – Mott the Hoople [1974]
SD-7298 – Starless and Bible Black – King Crimson [1974]
SD-7299 – Inner Spectrum – Ace Spectrum [1974] 
SD-7300 – Crosswinds – Billy Cobham [1974]
SD-7301 – Road – Johnny Rivers [1974]
SD-7302 – Blessed Assurance – Marion Williams [1974]
SD-7303 – Your Baby Is a Lady – Jackie DeShannon [1974]
SD-7304 – These Foolish Things – Bryan Ferry [1974]
SD-7305 – The Everything Man – Jimmy Castor & Jimmy Castor Bunch [1974]
SD-7306 – Hey There Girl – David Rogers [11/74]
SD-7307 – Isaac Guillory – Isaac Guillory [1974]
SD-7308 – AWB – Average White Band [1974] 
SD-7309 – Diane Steinberg – Diane Steinberg [1974]
SD-7310 – Tracy Nelson – Tracy Nelson [1974] 
SD-7311 – Teasin' – Cornell Dupree [1974]

18100-18232 "Popular"
SD-18100 – So Far – Crosby, Stills, Nash and Young [1974]
SD-18101 – Waterloo – ABBA [1974]
SD-18102 – Captain Buckles – David "Fathead" Newman [1974] 
SD-18103 – Yesterdays – Yes [1975]
SD-18104 – Touch – Barnaby Bye [1974]
SD-18105 - We've Grown Close - Terry Stafford [unreleased]
SD-18106 – Fresh – Oscar Brown Jr. [1975]
SD-18107 – Nightmares... and Other Tales From the Vinyl Jungle – J. Geils Band [1974]
SD-18108 – Let's Love – Peggy Lee [1974] 
SD-18109 – War Babies – Hall and Oates [1974]
SD-18110 – Red – King Crimson [1974]
SD-18111 – Hot City – Gene Page 
SD-18112 – The Band Kept Playing – Electric Flag [1975] 
SD-18113 – Another Time, Another Place – Bryan Ferry [11/74]
SD-18114 – Roller Coaster Weekend – Joe Vitale [1975]
SD-18115 – Wally – Wally [1974] 
SD-18116 – With Everything I Feel in Me – Aretha Franklin [1974]
SD-18117 – Prone To Lean – Donnie Fritts [1974]
SD-18118 – New and Improved – Spinners [1974]
SD-18119 – My Way – Major Harris [1975] 
SD-18120 – The Prophet By Kahlil Gibran – Richard Harris [1975] 
SD-18121 – Total Eclipse – Billy Cobham [1974]
SD-18122 – Relayer – Yes [1974] 
SD-18123 – Tonto's Expanding Head Band – Robert Margouleff and Malcolm Cecil [1974] This album is a reissue of Embryo SD-732.
SD-18124 – Butt of Course – Jimmy Castor Bunch [1975] 
SD-18125 – So Long Harry Truman – Danny O'Keefe [1975] 
SD-18126 – Margie – Margie Joseph [1975]
SD-18127 – Common Sense – John Prine [3/75] 
SD-18128 – Keep on Runnin' – Black Heat [1975] 
SD-18129 – Mel Tormé at the Maisonette – Mel Tormé [1975]
SD-18130 – Welcome to My Nightmare – Alice Cooper [1975] Atlantic was the US distributor of this LP, which was released by Anchor Records in the UK.
SD-18131 – Feel Like Makin' Love – Roberta Flack [1975]
SD-18132 – Supernatural – Ben E. King [4/75]
SD-18133 – The Manhattan Transfer – Manhattan Transfer [1975] 
SD-18134 – The Show Must Go On – Sam Dees [1975]
SD-18135 – Vance 32 – Vance 32 (Kenny Vance) [1975] 
SD-18136 – USA – King Crimson [1975]
SD-18137 – The Wiz (Original Cast) – Charles H. Coleman [1975]
SD-18138 – Upon the Wings of Music – Jean-Luc Ponty [1975]
SD-18139 – Shabazz – Billy Cobham [1975] 
SD-18140 – Cut the Cake – Average White Band [1975] 
SD-18141 – Pick of the Litter – Spinners [1975]
SD-18142 - Prayer Changes Things - Marion Williams
SD-18143 – Low Rent Rendezvous - Ace Spectrum
SD-18144 – Mirabai – Mirabai [1975]
SD-18145 – The Way We Were – Willis Jackson 
SD-18146 – ABBA [1975]
SD-18147 – Hotline – J. Geils Band [1975] 
SD-18148 – Live – The Sensational Alex Harvey Band [1975] 
SD-18149 – A Funky Thide of Sings – Billy Cobham [1975]
SD-18150 – Supersound – Jimmy Castor Bunch [1975]
SD-18151 – You – Aretha Franklin [1975] 
TP-18152 – Wind on the Water — Crosby & Nash [1975] Issued by Atlantic on the 8-track and cassette formats only; the vinyl album was issued on ABC ABCD-902.
SD-18153 – Michel Polnareff [1976] 
SD-18154 – Beginnings – Steve Howe [1975] 
SD-18155 – Songs for the New Depression – Bette Midler [1975] 
SD-18156 – Stephen Stills Live [1975]
SD-18157 – You Gotta Wash Your Ass – Redd Foxx [1975] The LP, which identifies no bands or tracks, was recorded live at the Apollo Theater in Harlem in 1975.
SD-18158 – Disco-Trek – Various Artists [1976]
SD-18159 – Fish Out of Water – Chris Squire [1975] 
SD-18160 – Jealousy – Major Harris [1976] 
SD-18161 – Lovelock – Gene Page [1976]
SD-18162 – Doldinger Jubilee 75 – Passport [1976] 
SD-18163 – Aurora – Jean-Luc Ponty [1976] 
SD-18164 – Locked In – Wishbone Ash [1976] 
SD-18165 – The Reason Why I'm Talking S--t – Eddie Harris [5/76]
SD-18166 – Life and Times – Billy Cobham [1976] 
SD-18167 – Ramshackled – Alan White [4/76]
SD-18168 – Mike Douglas Sings It All – Mike Douglas [1976]
SD-18169 – I Had a Love – Ben E. King [1976]
SD-18170 – A Street Called Straight – Roy Buchanan [1976]
SD-18171 – The Don Harrison Band [1976] 
SD-18172 – Where the Happy People Go – Trammps [1976]
SD-18173 -
SD-18174 – Firefall – Firefall [1976]
SD-18175 – The Story Of I – Patrick Moraz [1976] 
SD-18176 – Sparkle (Soundtrack) – Aretha Franklin [1976]
SD-18177 – Lovingly – Sylvia Syms [7/76]
SD-18178 – Lipstick – Michel Polnareff [6/76]
SD-18179 – Soul Searching – Average White Band [1976]
SD-18180 – Olias of Sunhillow – Jon Anderson [1976]
SD-18181 – Happiness Is Being With the Spinners The Spinners [1976] 
SD-18182 – Reggae II – Herbie Mann 
SD-18183 – Coming Out – Manhattan Transfer [1976] (9-76, #48)
TP-18184 – Whistling Down the Wire — Crosby & Nash [1976] Issued by Atlantic on the 8-track and cassette formats only; the vinyl album was issued on ABC ABCD-956.
SD-18185 – Just Like in the Movies – Ace Spectrum [1976]
SD-18186 – E-Man Groovin' – Jimmy Castor Bunch [1976]
SD-18187 – Let's Stick Together – Bryan Ferry [1976]
SD-18188 – Dee Dee Bridgewater – Dee Dee Bridgewater [1976] 
SD-18189 – Greatest Hits – ABBA [1976]
SD-18190 – Photograph – Melanie [1976]
SD-18191 – Rhapsody – Ben E. King [1976]
SD-18192 – Songs For Evolution – Anglo-Saxon Brown [1976]
SD-18193 – Ringo's Rotogravure – Ringo Starr [1976] 
SD-18194 – Live-On Tour In Europe – The Billy Cobham/George Duke Band [1976] 
SD-18195 – Imaginary Voyage – Jean-Luc Ponty [1976] 
SD-18196 – Frannie Golde – Frannie Golde [1976]
SD-18197 – Bristol's Creme – Johnny Bristol [1976] 
SD-18198 – Golden Soul – Various Artists [1976]
SD-18199 – Garden of Love Light – Narada Michael Walden [1977]
SD-18200 – New England – Wishbone Ash [1976]
SD-18201 – Still Stills: Best of Stephen Stills – Stephen Stills [1976] 
SD-18202 – Prime Prine: The Best of John Prine – John Prine [1976]
SD-18203 – Laverne and Shirley Sing – Cindy Williams and Penny Marshall [1976]
SD-18204 – Ten Years of Gold – Aretha Franklin [12/76]
SD-18205 – L – Steve Hillage [1976]
SD-18206 - 
SD-18207 – Arrival – ABBA [1976]
SD-18208 – Red Hot – Don Harrison Band [1/77]
SD-18209 – Bird in a Silver Cage – Herbie Mann [1976] (2-77, #132) 
SD-18210 – Eli – Jan Akkerman and Kaz Lux [1976] Eli/Guardian Angel/Tranquillizer/Can't Fake A Good Time//There He Still Goes/Strindberg/Wings Of Strings/Naked Actress/Fairytale
SD-18211 – Disco Inferno – Trammps [1976]
SD-18212 – Mr. Flute – Art Webb [1976]
SD-18213 – No Goodbyes – Hall and Oates [1977]
SD-18214 – A Blow For Me-A Toot For You – Fred Wesley and Horny Horns [1977]
SD-18215 – Foreigner [1977] 
SD-18216 – In Your Mind – Bryan Ferry [1977]
SD-18217 – Hear & Now – Don Cherry [7/77] 
SD-18218 – El Mirage – Jimmy Webb [1977]
SD-18219 – Loading Zone – Roy Buchanan [1977]
SD-18220 – Back Together Again – Coryell & Mouzon [1977] 
SD-18221 – Jay Boy Adams [1977]
SD-18222 -
SD-18223 - Malombo - Malombo [1977]
SD-18224 -
SD-18225 – Serengeti Minstrel – Sonny Fortune [10/77]
SD-18226 – Love Eyes – Art Webb [10/77]
SD-18227 – Music from Other Galaxies and Planets – Don Ellis [1977]
SD-18228 -
SD-18229 -
SD-18230 -
SD-18231 – Pele (Soundtrack) – Sergio Mendes [1977]
SD-18232 – Mark Farner [11/77]

19100 "Popular" SeriesAtlantic began this series mostly by reissuing its more popular titles.'SD-19100 – Yesterday, Today and Tomorrow – Spinners [1977] 
SD-19101 – Luna Sea – Firefall [1977] 
SD-19102 – Sweet Passion – Aretha Franklin [1977] 
SD-19103 – Monkey Island – Geils [1977] Band name is Geils for this album only. 
SD-19104 – CSN – Crosby Stills and Nash [1977] 
SD-19105 – Benny and Us – Average White Band and Ben E. King [1977]
SD-19106 – Going For the One – Yes [1977] This release uses a custom label.
SD-19107 – I Love My Wife – Original Cast [1977] Produced by Cy Coleman. Cast includes Lenny Baker, Joanna Gleason, Ilene Graff, and James Naughton, with the band directed by John Miller.
SD-19108 – Ringo the 4th – Ringo Starr [1977]
SD-19109 – Foreigner [1977] Reissue of Atlantic SD-18215. 
SD-19110 – Enigmatic Ocean – Jean-Luc Ponty [1977] 
SD-19111 – Maximum Stimulation – Jimmy Castor Bunch [1977]
SD-19112 – Herbie Mann & Fire Island – Herbie Mann [1977]
SD-19113 – Playmates – Small Faces [8/77]
SD-19114 – Greatest Hits – ABBA [1977] Reissue of Atlantic SD 18189.
SD-19115 – Arrival – ABBA [1977] Reissue of Atlantic SD-18207.
SD-19116 – Average White Band – Average White Band [1977] Reissue of Atlantic SD-7308. 
SD-19117 – Crosby Stills and Nash – Crosby Stills and Nash [1977] Reissue of Atlantic SD-8229.
SD-19118 – Deja Vu – Crosby Stills and Nash [1977] Reissue of Atlantic SD-7200.
SD-19119 – So Far – Crosby, Stills, Nash and Young [1977] Reissue of Atlantic SD- 18100.
SD-19120 – Emerson Lake and Palmer [1977] Reissue of Cotillion SD-9040. 
SD-19121 – Tarkus – Emerson Lake and Palmer [1977] Reissue of Cotillion SD-9900. 
SD-19122 – Pictures At An Exhibition – Emerson Lake and Palmer [1977] Reissue of Cotillion ELP-66666.
SD-19123 – Trilogy – Emerson Lake and Palmer [1977] Reissue of Cotillion SD-9903.
SD-19124 – Brain Salad Surgery – Emerson Lake and Palmer [1977] Reissue of Manticore MS-66669.
SD-19125 – Firefall – Firefall [1977] Reissue of Atlantic SD-18174. 
SD-19126 – Led Zeppelin – Led Zeppelin [1977] Reissue of Atlantic SD-8216.
SD-19127 – Led Zeppelin II – Led Zeppelin [1977] Reissue of Atlantic SD-8236.
SD-19128 – Led Zeppelin III – Led Zeppelin [1977] Reissue of Atlantic SD-7201.
SD-19129 – 4 – Led Zeppelin [1977] Reissue of Atlantic SD-7208. 
SD-19130 – Houses of the Holy – Led Zeppelin [1977] Reissue of Atlantic SD-7255. 
SD-19131 – The Yes Album – Yes [1977] Reissue of Atlantic SD-8283. 
SD-19132 – Fragile – Yes [1977] Reissue of Atlantic SD-7211. 
SD-19133 – Close To the Edge – Yes [1977] Reissue of Atlantic SD-7244.
SD-19134 – Yesterdays – Yes [1977] Reissue of Atlantic SD-18103.
SD-19135 – Relayer – Yes [1977] Reissue of Atlantic SD-18122.
SD-19136 – Imaginary Voyage – Jean Luc Ponty [1977] Reissue of SD-18195.
SD-19137 -
SD-19138 – Loading Zone – Roy Buchanan [1977] Reissue of Atlantic SD-18219.
SD-19139 – Abandoned Luncheonette – Hall and Oates [1977] Reissue of Atlantic SD- 7269.
SD-19140 – Eye of the Beholder – Ray Barretto [1977]
SD-19141 – I Cry, I Smile – Narada Michael Walden [11/77]
SD-19142 – True To Life – Ray Charles [1978]
SD-19143 – Hear To Tempt You – Temptations [1977]
SD-19144 – Motivation Radio – Steve Hillage [1978]
SD-19145 – Love For Sale – Boney M [1978] 
SD-19146 – Spinners/8 – Spinners [1977]
SD-19147 – Works, Volume 2 – Emerson Lake and Palmer [1977]
SD-19148 – The Trammps III – Trammps [1977] 
SD-19149 – Blue Lights In the Basement – Roberta Flack [1977]
SD-19150 – Crosby-Nash: Live – Crosby and Nash [1978] Possible reissue of ABC AA-1042.
SD-19151 – Broken Blossom – Bette Midler [1977]
SD-19152 – Leif Garrett – Leif Garrett [1977]
SD-19153 – Chic – Chic [1977]
SD-19154 – Killing Me Softly – Roberta Flack [1978] Reissue of Atlantic SD-7271.
SD-19155 – In the Court of the Crimson King – King Crimson [1978] Reissue of Atlantic SD-8245.
SD-19156 – John Prine – John Prine [1978] Reissue of Atlantic SD-8296.
SD-19157 – Welcome To My Nightmare – Alice Cooper [1978] Reissue of Atlantic SD-18130.
SD-19158 – Aurora – Jean-Luc Ponty [1978] Reissue of Atlantic SD-18163.
SD-19159 – Jan Akkerman – Jan Akkerman [1978] 
SD-19160 – Make It Good – Prince Phillip Mitchell [3/78]
SD-19161 – Almighty Fire – Aretha Franklin [1978] 
SD-19162 – Warmer Communications – Average White Band [1978]
SD-19163 – Pastiche – Manhattan Transfer [1978]
SD-19164 – The Album – ABBA [1978]
SD-19165 – Fotomaker – Fotomaker [1978]
SD-19166 – Boz Scaggs – Boz Scaggs [3/78] Reissue of Atlantic SD-8239.
SD-19167 – Still Here – Ian Thomas Band [1978]
SD-19168 – A Dance Fantasy Inspired by Close Encounters of the Third Kind – Vince Montana [1978]
SD-19169 – Brazil: Once Again – Herbie Mann [1978] 
SD-19170 – You're Not Alone – Roy Buchanan [1978] 
SD-19171 – 78 In the Shade – Small Faces [10/78]
SD-19172 – Richard Wagner – Richard Wagner [1978] 
SD-19173 – ...And Then There Were Three... – Genesis [1978] 
SD-19174 – Inner Conflicts – Billy Cobham [1978]
SD-19175 – I Wasn't Born Yesterday – Allan Clarke [5/78]
SD-19176 – Rings Around the Moon – Carillo [1978]
SD-19177 – Sky Blue – Passport [1978]
SD-19178 – Live At Montreux – Don Ellis [1978]
SD-19179 – The Best of The Spinners – Spinners [1978]
SD-19180 – Powerage – AC/DC [1978]
SD-19181 – Peter Gabriel – Peter Gabriel [1978] 
SD-19182 – Feeling My Way – Margie Joseph [1978]
SD-19183 – Elan – Firefall [1978] 
SD-19184 – Strangers – Johnny Bristol [1978]
SD-19185 – Bamboo Magic – Chris Hinze [9/78] 
SD-19186 – Roberta Flack – Roberta Flack [1978]
SD-19187 – Infinity Is – Sonny Fortune [1978] 
SD-19188 – Bare Back – Temptations [1978]
SD-19189 – Cosmic Messenger – Jean-Luc Ponty [1978]
SD-19190 – Memories Of The Future - Danny Toan [1978]
SD-19191 – Badlands – Bill Chinnock [1978] 
SD-19192 - 
SD-19193 – Sunshower – Joachim Kuhn with Jan Akkerman [1978]
SD-19194 – The Best of The Trammps – Trammps [1978]
SD-19195 – Fork In the Road – Jay Boy Adams [9/78]
SD-19196 – No Frills – Mark Farner Band [1979] 
SD-19197 – Vincent Montana Jr. Presents Goody Goody – Goody Goody [1978]
SD-19198 – Can You Feel It – Ray Barretto [1978] 
SD-19199 – Love and Peace – Ray Charles [1979]
SD-19200 – Let Me Live In Your Life – Ben E. King [9/78]
SD-19201 – Funk Or Walk – Brides of Funkenstein [1978]
SD-19202 – Tormato – Yes [1978] 
SD-19203 – The Best of David Crosby and Graham Nash – Crosby and Nash [1979] Possible reissue of ABC AA 1102.
SD-19204 – Sunbelt – Herbie Mann [1979] 
SD-19205 – The Bride Stripped Bare - Bryan Ferry [1978]
SD-19206 – Joe Brooks Group – Joe Brooks [12/78]
SD-19207 – Feel No Fret – Average White Band [1979]
SD-19208 – Vis a Vis – Fotomaker [1978]
SD-19209 – C'est Chic – Chic [1979]
SD-19210 – The Whole World's Dancing – Trammps [1979]
SD-19211 – Love Beach – Emerson, Lake and Palmer [1978]
SD-19212 – If You Want Blood You've Got It – AC/DC [1978]
SD-19213 – Patrick Adams Presents – Phreek [1979]
SD-19214 – Midnight Rhythm – Midnight Rhythm [2/79]
SD-19215 – I Love Music – Vince Montana [1979]
SD-19216 – Disco Extravaganza, Phase 1 – George Bussey [1979]
SD-19217 – Briefcase Full of Blues – Blues Brothers [1978]
SD-19218 - The Manhattan Transfer Live - The Manhattan Transfer [1979]
SD-19219 – From Here to Eternally – Spinners [1979]
SD-19220 – The Final Thing – Joe Fleming [1979]
SD-19221 – Super Mann – Herbie Mann [1979] 
SD-19222 – Awakening – Narada Michael Walden [1979]
SD-19223 – Midnight Rendezvous – Tasha Thomas [1979] 
SD-19224 – Come Down To Earth – Energetics [1979] 
HT-19225 – Magic Man – Broadway [5/79] This album is on the Hilltak label.
HT-19226 – Choice – Gary Dalton & Kent Dubarri [1979] This album is on the Hilltak label.
HT 19227 – All This For A Song – The Guess Who [1979] This album is on the Hilltak label. 
SD-19228 – Under Heaven Over Hell – Streetheart [1979]
SD-19229 – Live – Jean-Luc Ponty [1979]
SD-19230 – Perspective – Stefan Grossman [1979]
SD-19231 – Top of the Line – Prince Phillip Mitchell [6/79]
SD-19232 – Grey Ghost – Henry Paul Band [1979]
SD-19233 – Garden of Eden – Passport [1979]
SD-19234 – Best of The J. Geils Band – J. Geils Band [1979]
SD-19235 – Street of Dreams – Carillo [1979]
SD-19236 – Flee – The Jeremy Spencer Band [6/79]
SD-19237 – I Love to Dance – Kleeer [6/79] 
SD-19238 – Best of Billy Cobham – Billy Cobham [1979]
SD-19239 – With Sound Reason – Sonny Fortune [1979]
SD-19240 – Fire on the Tracks – The Cate Bros. Band [1979] 
SD-19241 – Live – Jan Akkerman [6/79]
SD-19242 – Fickle Heart – Sniff 'N' the Tears [1979] 
SD-19243 – The Steve Howe Album – Steve Howe [1979]
SD-19244 – Highway To Hell – AC/DC [1979]
SD-19245 – Music Man – Revanche [10/79] 
SD-19246 – Transfer Station – Fotomaker [1979]
SD-19247 -
SD-19248 – La Diva – Aretha Franklin [1979]
SD-19249 – The Day the Earth Caught Fire – City Boy [1979]
SD-19250 – Cerrone V-Angelina – Cerrone [11/79]
SD-19251 – Ain't It So – Ray Charles [1979]
SD-19252 – Yellow Fever – Herbie Mann [1980]
SD-19253 – A Taste for Passion – Jean-Luc Ponty [1979]
SD-19254 – Say Blow By Blow Backwards – Fred Wesley and Horny Horns [1979]
SD-19255 – In Concert – Emerson Lake and Palmer [1979]
SD-19256 – Dancin' and Lovin' – Spinners [1979] 
SD-19257 - Good to Me - THP [1979]
SD-19258 – Extensions – Manhattan Transfer [1979] 
SD-19259 – The Dance Of Life – Narada Michael Walden [1979]
SD-19260 – Therfu – Turley Richards [1980] 
SD-19261 – Never Buy Texas From a Cowboy – Brides of Funkenstein [1980]
SD-19262 – Winners – Kleeer [1980]
SD-19263 – On – Off Broadway usa [1980] 
SD-19264 -
SD-19265 – Oceanliner – Passport [1980] 
SD-19266 – Volume VIII – Average White Band [1980]
SD-19267 – Mixin' It Up – Trammps [1979]
SD-19268 – Laurie and the Sighs – Laurie and the Sighs [5/80] 
SD-19269 – Music Trance – Ben E. King [1980]
SD-19270 – Love Trippin' – Spinners [1980]
SD-19271 – After the Roses – Kenny Rankin [1980]
SD-19272 – The Game's Up – Sniff 'N' the Tears [1980]
SD-19273 – Feel the Heat – Henry Paul Band [1980]
SD-19274 – Broken Home – Broken Home [1980]
SD-19275 – Stones – Dan Seals [1980]
WTG19276 – Ready An' Willing – Whitesnake [1980]
SD-19277 – Selling England By the Pound – Genesis [1980] Reissue of Charisma CAS 6060.
SD-19278 – In Performance – Donny Hathaway [1980] 
SD-19279 – Victory – Narada Michael Walden [1980]
WTG19280 – Rock 'N' Roll Outlaw – Rose Tattoo [1980]
SD-19281 – Brother Ray Is At It Again! – Ray Charles [1980] 
SD-19282 – Hands in the Till – Fortress [1981]
SD-19283 – The Best of Emerson Lake and Palmer – Emerson Lake and Palmer [1980] 
SD-19284 – Best of the J. Geils Band Two – J. Geils Band [11/80]
SD-19285 – Heads Are Rolling – City Boy [1980]
SD-19286 – Quick Turns – Off Broadway usa [11/80] 
SD-19287 – Free Fall – Alvin Lee Band [1980]
SD-19288 – License To Dream – Kleeer [1981] 
SD-19289 – Branigan – Laura Branigan [1982]
SD-19290 – Slipping Out – Trammps [1981]
WTG19291 – House Of Music – T.S. Monk [1981] The label on this album is Mirage. 
WTG19292 – Live... In The Heart Of The City – Whitesnake [1980] The label on this two record set is Mirage.
SD-19293 – Rocket 88 – Rocket 88 [1981] 
SD-19294 – Love Keys – Eddie Kendricks [8/81]
SD-19295 – Warhead – More [1981] 
SD-19296 – Ullanda McCullough -Ullanda McCollough [1981]
WTG19297 – Rock Away – Phoebe Snow [1981] The label on this album is Mirage.
SD-19298 -
SD-19299 – ZED [1981]
SD-19300 – Street Tough – Ben E. King [4/81]
SD-19301 – Miracles – Change [1981]
SD-19302 – Iron Age – Mother's Finest [1981]
SD-19303 – Stand Back – April Wine [1981] Reissue of Big Tree BT 89506. 
SD-19304 – Blue Tattoo – Passport [1981]
RR-19305 – The Meadows – Meadows [1981] The label on this album is Radio Records.
SD-19306 – RX5 – Alvin Lee [10/81] 
SD-19307 – Kix [1981]
SD-19308 – Gwen McCrae – Gwen McCrae [1981]
SD-19309 – Dr. Rhythm – M-Zee Band [1981]
WTG19310 – Rage – Rage [1981] The label is Carrere/Mirage.
SD-19311 – Coup De Grace – Mink DeVille [1981]
WTG19312 – Assault And Battery – Rose Tattoo [1981] The label on this album is Mirage.
SD-19313 – Abacab – Genesis [1981]
RR 19314 – Stars On Long Play II – Stars On [1981]
RY-19315 – Watts in a Tank – Diesel [1981] The label on this album is Regency.
SD-19316 – The Best of Firefall – Firefall [1981]
SD-19317 – The Best of Roberta Flack – Roberta Flack [1981]
SD-19318 – Can't Shake This Feelin' – Spinners [1981]
SD-19319 – The Best of The Manhattan Transfer [1981]
SD-19320 – Classic Yes [1981] Includes a bonus 7" single.
RR-19321 – The All Sports Band [1981] The label on this album is Radio Records.
SD-19322 -
SD-19323 – Take It Off – Chic [1981]
WTG19324 – More Of The Good Life – T.S. Monk [1981] 
SD-19325 – Anytime – Henry Paul Band [1981]
SD-19326 – A Place For My Stuff! – George Carlin [1981] 
WTG19327 – New York Cake – Kano [1981] The label on this album is Mirage. 
SD-19328 – Get On Up and Do It Again – Suzy Q [4/82]
SD-19329 - For Those About To Rock (We Salute You) - AC/DC [1981] Used for a select group of international releases only; North American releases use the catalog number SD-11111.
SD-19330 – This Must Be Heaven – Jerry Carr [1981] This is on the Cheri label.
SD-19331 – Best of the Blues Brothers [1981] 
SD-19332 – The Visitors – ABBA [1981]
SD-19333 – Mystical Adventures – Jean-Luc Ponty [1982] 
SD-19334 – Taste The Music – Kleeer [1982]
RR-19335 – Growing In The Dark – Glass Moon [1982] The label on this album is Radio.
SD-19336 – Harbinger – Dan Seals [1982]
SD-19337 – Mondo Rock Chemistry – Mondo Rock [1982]
SD-19338 – Adventures In Clubland – Modern Romance [1982]
SD-19339 – Blood and Thunder – More [7/82]
SD-19340 -
WTG19341 – Snack Attack – Godley & Creme [1982] The label on this album is Mirage.
SD-19342 – Sharing Your Love – Change [1982]
SD-19343 – Voggue – Voggue [1982]
SD-19344 – One To One – Carole King [1982]
SD-19345 – Glorious Fool – John Martyn [1982]
SD-19346 – Recorded Live – Otis Redding [1982]
SD-19347 – Angst In My Pants – Sparks [1982] 
SD-19348 – Das Boot – Soundtrack [1982]
RR-19349 – Stars On Long Play III – Stars On [1982] The label on this album is Radio.
SD-19350 – Sippie Wallace – Sippie Wallace [1982]
SD-19351 – Confidence – Narada Michael Walden [1982]
SD-19352 -
WTG19353 – Soup For One (Soundtrack) – Various Artists [1982] The label on this album is Mirage. 
SD-19354 – I'm the One – Roberta Flack [1981] 
SD-19355 – Animation – Jon Anderson [1982]
RR-19356 – The Instructions [1982] The label on this album is Radio Records.
WTG19357 – Exposed – Schneider with the Kick [1982] The label on this album is Mirage.
SD-19358 – Face to Face – Gino Soccio [1982]
SD-19359 -
SD-19360 – Daylight Again – Crosby Stills and Nash [1982]
SD-19361 – Ph.D – Ph.D [1982]
SD-19362 -
SD-19363 – Star Trek II: The Wrath of Khan (Soundtrack) – James Horner [1982]
SD-19364 – Hot on the Clue -New York Express [1982]
SD-19365 – Nugent – Ted Nugent [1982]

16000 "Popular" Series
SD-16000 – Voulez-Vous – ABBA [1979]
SD-16001 – The Muppet Movie (Soundtrack) – Muppets [1979]
SS-16002 – In Through the Out Door – Led Zeppelin [1979] The label on this album is Swan Song. 
SD-16003 – Risqué – Chic [1979]
SD-16004 – Thighs and Whispers – Bette Midler [1979]
SD-16005 -
SD-16006 – Undertow – Firefall [1980]
SD-16007 -
SB-16008 – Same Goes For You – Leif Garrett [1979] The label on this album is Scotti Brothers.
SD-16009 – Greatest Hits, Vol. 2 – ABBA [1979]
SD-16010 – The Rose (Soundtrack) – Bette Midler [1979]
SD-16011 – Les Plus Grands Succès De Chic: Chic's Greatest Hits – Chic [1979]
SD-16012 – Love Somebody Today – Sister Sledge [1980] The label on this album is Cotillion.
SD-16013 – Roberta Flack Featuring Donny Hathaway [1980]
SD-16014 – Duke – Genesis [1980]
COC16015 – Emotional Rescue – Rolling Stones [1980] The label on this album is Rolling Stones.
SD-16016 – Real People – Chic [1980] 
SD-16017 – The Blues Brothers (Soundtrack) [1980] 
SD-16018 – Back In Black – AC/DC [1980]
SD-16019 – Drama – Yes [1980] 
SD-16020 – Civilized Evil – Jean-Luc Ponty [1980]
SD-16021 – Song of Seven – Jon Anderson [1980]
SD-16022 – Bette Midler In Divine Madness (Soundtrack) [1980]
SD-16023 – Super Trouper – ABBA [1980]
SD-16024 – Clouds Across the Sun – Firefall [1980] 
SD-16025 – Made in America – Blues Brothers [1980]
SD-16026 – Replay – Crosby Stills and Nash [1980]
SD-16027 – All American Girls – Sister Sledge [1981] The label on this album is Cotillion.
COC16028 – Sucking in the Seventies – Rolling Stones [1981] The label on this album is Rolling Stones. 
SD-16029 – Face Value – Phil Collins [1981]
RR-16030 – Say No More – Badfinger [1981] The label on this album is Radio.
SD-16031 – Live At Montreax – Mingus Dynasty [1981]
SD-16032 – Labor of Love – Spinners [1981]
SD-16033 – Dirty Deeds Done Dirt Cheap – AC/DC [1981]
SS-16034 – Twangin' – Dave Edmunds [1981]
SD-16035 - Doyawanna - L.A. [1981] The label on this album is Radio.
SD-16036 – Mecca For Moderns – Manhattan Transfer [1981] 
SD-16037 – Songs of the Beatles – Sarah Vaughan [1981]
WTG16038 – In The World – G.E. Smith [1981] The label on this album is Mirage.
SD-16039 - Ph.D. - Ph.D. [1982] Also issued as SD-19361.
SD-16040 – All Toys Break – Elusion [1981]
SD-16041 – Brother Luck – ADC Band [1981]
SD-16042 – Closer – Gino Soccio [1981]
WTG16043 – Come an' Get It – Whitesnake [1981] The label on this album is Mirage.
RR-16044 – Stars On Long Play – Stars On [1981] The label on this album is Radio.
RR-16045 – Lonnie Youngblood – Lonnie Youngblood [1981] The label on this album is Radio.
SD-16046 – Mellow – Herbie Mann [1981]
SD-16047 – The Great Muppet Caper – Muppets [1981]
SS-16048 – Sad Café [1981] The label on this album is Swan Song.
SD-16049 – With You – Stacy Lattisaw [1981] The label on this album is Cotillion. 
RR-16050 – Seasons – Max Werner [1981] The label on this album is Radio.
WTG16051 – The Night The Lights Went Out In Georgia (Soundtrack) – Various Artists [1981] The label on this album is Mirage. 
COC16052 – Tattoo You – Rolling Stones [1981] Label is on this album is Rolling Stones.

Multiple-album sets
Unlike many other labels, Atlantic issued multiple-LP sets in a special series. In fact, there were many of these special series, each with its own slant from the prospective of the Atlantic catalog makers.

Atlantic 2-300 Jazz Series

SD-2-300 – The Evolution of Mann – Herbie Mann [1973] (2-LP set)
SD-2-301 – The Art of the Modern Jazz Quartet – Modern Jazz Quartet [1973] (2-LP set)
SD-2-302 – The Art of Charles Mingus: The Atlantic Years
SD-2-303 – The Art of Rahsaan Roland Kirk – Art of Rahsaan Roland Kirk [1973] (2-LP set)
SD2-304 – The Great Paris Concert – Duke Ellington [1973] (2-LP set)
SD-2-305 – Inner Space – Chick Corea [1974] (2-LP set)
SD-2-306 – The Commodore Years – Coleman Hawkins and Frank Wess [8/73] (2-LP set)
SD-2-307 – The Commodore Years – Lester Young, Chu Berry, Ben Webster [8/73] (2- LP set)
SD-2-308 – The Commodore Years – Jelly Roll Morton: New Orleans Memories and Last Band Dates
SD-2-309 – The Commodore Years – Eddie Condon & Bud Freeman [1974] (2-LP set)
SD-2-310 – The Commodore Years – Town Hall Jazz Concert 1945 [1973](2-LP set)
SD-2-311 – Excursions – Eddie Harris [8/73] (2-LP set)
SD-2-312 – Live at Montreux – Les McCann [8/73] (2-LP set)
SD-2-313 – The Art of John Coltrane – John Coltrane [8/73] (2-LP set)
SD-2-314 – The Art of Freddie Hubbard – Freddie Hubbard [8/73] (2-LP set)
SD-2-315 – The Art of Hank Crawford – Hank Crawford [8/73] (2-LP set)
SD-2-316 – The Jazz Years-25th Anniversary – Mose Allison [8/73] (2-LP set)
SD-2-317 – The Art of Dave Brubeck: The Fantasy Years – Dave Brubeck [8/75] (2-LP set)
SD-2-318 -
SD-2-319 – The Art of Milt Jackson (The Atlantic Years) – Milt Jackson [8/75] (2-LP set)
SD-2-320 -
SD-2-321 – Turn of the Century – Gary Burton [1973] (2-LP set)

[SD-2-400 series used for Atco label]

Atlantic 2-500 Soul Series

This is a series of 2-LP sets.

SD-2-500 – Heavy Soul – Various Artists [1972] (2-LP set)
SD-2-501 – Wilson Pickett's Greatest Hits – Wilson Pickett [1973] (2-LP set)
SD-2-502 – Ann Arbor Blues and Jazz Festival – Various Artists [1973] (2-LP set)
SD-2-503 – Live – Ray Charles [1973] (2-LP set)
SD-2-504 – The Atlantic Soul Years – Various Artists [1973] (2-LP set) 
SD-2-505 -
SD-2-506 - [untitled] - Various Artists [unissued]
SD-2-507 – Live – Blow Your Face Out – J. Geils Band [1976] (2-LP set)
SD-2-508 – Live At CGBG's – Various Artists [1976] (2-LP set)
SD-2-509 – Tomorrow Barretto Live – Ray Barretto [1977] (2-LP set) 
SD-2-510 – Yesshows – Yes [12/80] (2-LP set)

Atlantic 2-600 Jazz Series

This is an early series of 2-LP sets that lay dormant for a decade before being revived in the 1970s.

2-601 – Chris Connor Sings George Gershwin – Chris Connor [7/57] Two record set of Atlantic 1309 and 1310.
2-602 – The Art of Mabel Mercer – Mabel Mercer [1/58] (2-LP set)
2-603/SD-2-603 – European Concert – Modern Jazz Quartet [1961] Two record set of Atlantic SD-1385 and SD-1386. 
2-604/SD-2-604 – Mabel Mercer and Bobby Short At Town Hall – Mabel Mercer and Bobby Short (2-LP set)
SD-2-605 – Tootsie – Herbie Mann (2-LP set)
SD-2-606 – Bobby Short Loves Cole Porter – Bobby Short [1971] (2-LP set)
SD-2-607 – Mad About Noël Coward – Bobby Short [1972] (2-LP set)
SD-2-608 – K-Ra-Zy For Gershwin – Bobby Short [1973] (2-LP set)
SD-2-609 – Bobby Short Live At the Cafe Carlyle – Bobby Short [7/74]
SD-2-610 – Bobby Short Celebrates Rodgers and Hart – Bobby Short [1975] (2-LP set)

[SD-2-700 and SD-2-800 series were used for the Atco label.]

Atlantic 2-900 Popular Series

This is a series of 2-LP sets.

2-900 – Ray Charles Story – Ray Charles [1962] (2-LP set) This album combines 8063 The Ray Charles Story, Volume 1 and 8064 The Ray Charles Story, Volume 2 in a two album package with a gatefold sleeve.
SD-2-901 – Freedom Suite – Young Rascals [1969] (2-LP set)
SD-2-902 – 4 Way Street – Crosby, Stills, Nash and Young [1971] (2-LP set)
SD-2-903 – Manassas – Stephen Stills [1972] (2-LP set)
SD-2-904 – Great American Songbook – Carmen McRae [1972] (2-LP set)
SD-2-905 – The Giants of Jazz – Various Artists [1972] (2-LP set)
SD-2-906 – Amazing Grace – Aretha Franklin [1972] (2-LP set)
SD-2-907 – Bright Moments – Rahsaan Roland Kirk [2/74] (2-LP set) 
SD-2-908 – Tales From Topographic Oceans – Yes [1974] (2-LP set)
SD-2-909 – The Last Concert – Modern Jazz Quartet [1974] (2-LP set)
SD-2-910 – Spinners Live! [1975](2-LP set)

Atlantic 2-1000 Jazz Series

This is a series of 2-LP sets.

SD-2-1000 – Jaques Brel is Alive and Well and Living in Paris (Soundtrack) – Francois Rauber [1968] (2-LP set)
SD-2-1001 – 10 years Hence – Yusef Lateef [8/75] (2-LP set)
SD-2-1002 – Person To Person – Average White Band [1976] (2-LP set)
SD-2-1003 – The Vibration Continues – Rahssan Roland Kirk [3/78] (2-LP set)

Atlantic 2-2000 Popular Series

This is a series of 2-LP sets.

SD-2-2000 – Three Sides Live – Genesis [1982] (2-LP set) 
SD-2-2001 -
SD-2-2002 – Seconds Out – Genesis [1982?] (2-LP set) Reissue of Atlantic SD 2-9002.

Atlantic 2-3000 Jazz Series

These are 2-LP sets.

SD-2-3000 – Atlantic Family Live at Montreux – Various Artists [7/78] (2-LP set)
SD-2-3001 – Charles Mingus at Antibes – Charles Mingus [2/80] (2-LP set)

Atlantic 2-4000 Blues Series

A short series of blues and fusion music.

SD-2-4000 – Sneak Attack – Buddy Miles Regiment [8/81] (2-LP set)
SD-2-4001 – Last Mardi Gras – Professor Longhair [1982]
SD-2-4002
SD-2-4003 – Young Blood – The Coasters [1982]

Atlantic 2-7000 Popular Series

These are 2-LP sets.

SD-2-7000 – Works, Volume 1 – Emerson Lake and Palmer [1977]  (2-LP set)
SD-2-7001
SD-2-7002
SD-2-7003 – Requiem – Lennie Tristano [1977] (2-LP set)
SD-2-7004 – Live and More – Roberta Flack and Peabo Bryson [1980]
SD-2-7005 – Concerts for the People of Kampuchea – Various Artists [1981] (2-LP set) All tracks live and in stereo.
SD-2-7006 – Lennie Tristano Quartet – Lennie Tristano Quartet [2/82] (2-LP set)

Atlantic 2-9000 Series

These are 2-LP sets.

SD-2-9000 – Live At Last – Bette Midler [1977] (2-LP set)
COC-2-9001 - Love You Live'' - The Rolling Stones [1977] (2-LP set) The label on this album is Rolling Stones.
SD-2-9002 – Seconds Out – Genesis [1977] (2-LP set)

Atlantic Three and Four Record Sets

SD-3-100 – Yessongs – Yes [1973]
SD-100 – A Tribute on the Occasion of Her 75th Birthday – Mabel Mercer [1/75] (4-LP set)
SD-3-600 – Passions of a Man – Charles Mingus [6/78] (3-LP set)

Miscellaneous

ATLANTIC ALBUM DISCOGRAPHY, PART 12

Atlantic 3000 Jazz Series

SD-3001 – Bagpipe Blues – Rufus Harley [1965]
SD-3002 – Honeybuns – Duke Pearson Nonet [1966]
SD-3003 – Portrait in Soul – Valerie Capers [1966]
SD-3004 – Money in the Pocket – Joe Zawinul [1966]
SD-3005 – Prairie Dog – Duke Pearson [1966]
SD-3006 – Scotch and Soul – Rufus Harley [1966]
SD-3007 – Here Comes the Whistleman – Roland Kirk [1967]
SD-3008 – Deuces Wild – Sonny Stitt [1967]

Atlantic 4000 Poetry Series

SD-4001 – Allen Ginsberg Reads Kaddish – Allen Ginsberg [1966]

Atlantic 7100 Stereo-Only Series

SD-7101 – The Great Hits of Ray Charles Recorded on 8-Track Stereo – Ray Charles [1964]

Atlantic/Stax 7700 Reissue Series

Atlantic did reissue most of the Stax 700 album series with the same cover graphics and song lineup. See the Stax Discography for details of the albums. Atlantic added a 7 in front of the original Stax number.

SD-7701 – Green Onions – Booker T. and the MG's Reissue of Stax 701.
SD-7702 — Treasure Hits From The South - Various Artists Reissue of Stax 702
SD-7703 — The Treasure Chest Of Goldies - Various Artists Reissue of Stax 703
SD-7704 – Walking the Dog – Rufus Thomas Reissue of Stax 704.
SD-7705 – Soul Dressing – Booker T. and the MG's Reissue of Stax 705.
SD-7706 – Comfort Me – Carla Thomas Reissue of Stax 706.
SD-7707 – Great Memphis Sound – Mar-Keys Reissue of Stax 707.
SD-7708 – Hold on I'm Comin' – Sam and Dave Reissue of Stax 708.
SD-7709 – Carla – Carla Thomas Reissue of Stax 709.
SD-7710 – Memphis Gold – Various Artists Reissue of Stax 710.
SD-7711 – And Now – Booker T. and the MG's Reissue of Stax 711.
SD-7712 – Double Dynamite – Sam and Dave Reissue of Stax 712.
SD-7713 – In the Christmas Spirit – Booker T. and the MG's Reissue of Stax 713.
SD-7714 – Knock on Wood – Eddie Floyd Reissue of Stax 714.
SD-7715 – Wanted One Soul Singer – Johnnie Taylor Reissue of Stax 715.
SD-7716 – King and Queen – Otis Redding and Carla Thomas Reissue of Stax 716.
SD-7717 – Hip Hugger – Booker T. and the MG's Reissue of Stax 717.
SD-7718 – The Queen Alone – Carla Thomas Reissue of Stax 718.
SD-7719 – Soul of a Bell – William Bell Reissue of Stax 719.
SD-7720 – Back To Back – Mar-Keys and Booker T and the MG's Reissue of Stax 720.
SD-7721 – Live In London Volume 1 – Various Artists Reissue of Stax 721.
SD-7722 – Live In London Volume 2 – Various Artists Reissue of Stax 722.
SD-7723 – Born Under a Bad Sign – Albert King Reissue of Stax 723.
SD-7724 – Doin' Our Thing – Booker T. and the MG's Reissue of Stax 724.
SD-7725 – Soul Men – Sam and Dave Reissue of Stax 725.
SD-7726 – Memphis Gold Volume 2 – Various Artists Reissue of Stax 726.

Atlantic-Atco Sampler

AT-1/ATSD-1 – Atlantic-Atco All-Star Showcase – Various Artists [1965]

The Atlantic Group

This lone record was issued on the Atlantic Group label. The label is red with "ATLANTIC GROUP" above the center hole. Below is the Atlantic Group logo, a black circle with "Dial" in yellow, "STAX" in green and "ATLANTIC" in red.

SD-501 – The Super Hits – Various Artists [1967]

Special Numbers

SD-11111 – For Those About to Rock We Salute You – AC/DC [1981]
SD-19999 – Double Vision – Foreigner [1978]
SD-29999 – Head Games – Foreigner [1979]
SD-16999 – Foreigner 4 [1981]

R-001 –R-027 "Religious"
As would any major record label, Atlantic had, from 1967 to 1970, a numbering system solely devoted to gospel music and sermons.

SD R-001 – Perspectives in Gospel – Garden State Choir [1967]
SD R-002 – Presenting the Mighty Clouds of Harmony – Mighty Clouds of Harmony [1967]
SD R-003 – Hark the Voice – Sondra Williams [1967]
SD R-004 – Walter Arties Chorale Sings Jewels of Faith – Walter Arties Chorale [1967]
SD R-005 – Shine on Me – Harmonizing Four [1967]
SD R-006 – World's Greatest Gospel Organist – Alfred Bolden [1967]
SD R-007 – When I've Done the Best I Can – Gospel Chimes [1967]
SD R-008 – Gospel "Blessed With Soul" – Institutional Church of God in Christ [1967]
SD R-009 – Presenting George Hines and the Gospel Winds – George Hines and the Gospel Winds [1968]
SD R-010 – "In" Time – Garden State Choir [1968]
SD R-011 – Didn't It Rain – Mighty Clouds of Harmony [1968]
SD R-012 – Gospel Bliss – Richburg Singers [1968]
SD R-013 – 40 Years of Singing Gospel – Harmonizing Four [1968]
SD R-014 – Joy – Helen Robinson Youth Choir [1968]
SD R-015 – Holy and Righteous – Utterbach Concert Ensemble [1968]
SD R-016 – Lift Every Voice and Sing – Stars of Virginia [1968]
SD R-017 – His Name Is Wonderful – Walter Arties Chorale [1968]
SD R-018 – Gospel's Queen – Gloria Griffin [1968]
SD R-019 – We Shall Overcome – Alfred Bolden [1969]
SD R-020 – A Stirring Message – Rev. Edmond Blair [1968] 
SD R-021 - Grace - Institutional Church of God in Christ [1969]
SD R-022 – Gospel Erupts – Garden State Choir [1969]
SD R-023 – Gospel "Plus" – Mighty Clouds of Harmony [1969]
SD R-024 – Jimmy Ellis with the Riverview Spiritual Singers – Jimmy Ellis [10/69]
SD R-025 – Running For My Life – CYC Community Youth Choir [1969]
SD R-026 – Tommie, Lonnie and Me – Harmonizing Four [1970]
SD R-027 – George Hines and the Gospel Winds – George Hines and the Gospel Winds [1970]

Promotional records

Promotional or deejay records were issued regularly over the years. They were usually issued with white labels with black print in the same graphical designs as their commercial counterparts.

In addition, Atlantic issued a series of promotional albums using a 100 series. These are listed below, in an incomplete list.

LS-ST-119 – Atco Records Promotional LP for Record Department-In-Store-Play – New York Rock and Roll Ensemble/Cream [1968] This record has one side containing selections from Atco 33-240, "The New York Rock and Roll Ensemble" and the Cream album Atco 2-700 "Wheels of Fire".
TL-ST-121 – Atlantic Records Promotional LP for Record Department-In-Store-Play – Aretha Franklin/Rascals [1968] This record has one side containing selections from Atlantic LP8126 "Aretha Now" and the Rascals LP 8190 "Time Peace Greatest Hits".
TL-ST-124 – Atco Records Promotional LP for Record Department In-Store Play – King Curtis and Buffalo Springfield [1968] This record has one side containing selections from King Curtis Atco LP 33-247 "Sweet Soul" and Buffalo Springfield's Atco LP 33-256 "Last Time Around".
TL-ST-129 – Atlantic Records Promotional LP for Record Department-In-Store-Play – Booker T. and the MG's/Various Artists [1968] This record has one side containing selections from Atlantic LP 8202, "The Best of Booker T. and the MG's" and the various artists album Atlantic LP 8203 "Super Hits, Volume 3".
TL-ST-131 – Atco Records Promotional LP for Record Department-In-Store-Play – Otis Redding/King Curtis [1967] This record has one side containing selections from Otis Redding Atco LP 33-265, "Otis Redding In Person At the Whiskey A Go Go" and King Curtis Atco LP 33-266 "The Best of King Curtis".
TL-ST-132 – Atlantic Records Promotional LP for Record Department-In-Store-Play – Aretha Franklin/Archie Bell and the Drells [1968] This record has one side containing selections from Aretha Franklin Atlantic LP 8207, "Aretha In Paris" and Archie Bell and the Drells Atlantic LP 8204 "I Can't Stop Dancing".
TL-ST-133 – Atlantic-Atco Records Promotional LP for Record Department-In-Store-Play – Booker T. and the MG's/Various Artists [1968] This record has one side containing selections from Stax LP 713 "In the Christmas Spirit" by Booker T. and the MG's and the other side selections from Atco LP 33 269 "Soul Christmas". Album has white promo labels, cover has a picture of the second version of Stax LP 713 (Santa cover) and Atco LP 33-269. A DJ introduces the songs on each side.
TL-ST-134 – Atlantic Records Promotional LP for Record Department-In-Store-Play – Aretha Franklin/Clarence Carter [1968] This record has one side containing selections from Aretha Franklin Atlantic LP 8212 "Soul '69" and Clarence Carter Atlantic LP 8199 "The Dynamic Clarence Carter".
TL-ST-135 – Atlantic Records Promotional LP for Record Department-In-Store-Play – Led Zeppelin/Dusty Springfield [1969] This record has one side containing selections from Dusty Springfield Atlantic LP 8214 "Dusty In Memphis" and Led Zeppelin Atlantic LP 8216 "Led Zeppelin".
SP-137 – Freedom Suite Sampler – Rascals [1969]
PR-160 – Pete Townshend Talks To and About Thunderclap Newman – Pete Townshend [1970] Label is Track.
PR-164 – Interview with Mick Jagger by Tom Donahue – Mick Jagger [1971] This promotional release is on the Rolling Stones record label.
PR-165 – Crosby, Stills, Nash and Young Month Celebration Copy – Crosby, Stills, Nash and Young [1971]
PR-170 – Whatever's Fair! Atlantic's Soul Explosion '72 – Various Artists [1972] Two record set with white labels.
PR-180 – Heavies for January from Atlantic, Atco & RSO – Various Artists [1973] 
PR-202 – Stop in the Name of Love – Hollies [1983] 12 Inch promo single, same song both sides
PR-260 – Yes Solo LP Sampler – Yes [1976]
PR-277 – Works, Volume 1 Sampler – Emerson, Lake and Palmer [1977]
PR-278 – Westbound LP Sampler – Various Artists [1977]
PR-281 – On Tour With Emerson, Lake and Palmer – Emerson Lake & Palmer [1979]
PR-285 – Yes Music: An Evening with Jon Anderson – Yes [1977]
PR-291 – Reggae on Broadway – Bob Marley and the Wailers [1981] 12 Inch single, same song on both sides.
PR-300 – ABBA – ABBA [1978]
PR-387 – Keep the Fire Burning – Gwen McCrae [1982] 12 Inch single, same song on both sides.
PR-388 – Every Night/Lucille – Paul McCartney [1981] 12 Inch single.
PR-414 – Chances Are – Bob Marley and the Wailers [1981] 12 Inch single, same song on both sides.
PR-420 – As – Jean-Luc Ponty [1982] 12 Inch single, same song on both sides.
PR-427 – One to One – Carole King [1982] 12 Inch single, same song on both sides.
PR-432 – A Collection of Hits – ABBA [1982]
PR-436 – The ABBA Special – ABBA [1983] Two record set.
PR-439 – An Introduction to the Classics – Ray Charles, Albert King, Coasters and Professor Longhair [1983]

Related albums
This section includes some of the albums which are related to the Atlantic label, among them, the only album on National Records, and non-US reissues.

National Records
National Records was founded in 1944 by Al Green. The company was located at 1841 Broadway in New York City. The output of the label was pop, R&B, jazz, country and western, and gospel. A&R for the label was handled by Herb Abramson, Lee Magid and Bob Shad. The National Record catalog was acquired by Savoy Records in September 1957. There was only one LP released on the label.

NLP-2001 – Billy Eckstine – Billy Eckstine [10/49] This was a 10-inch album.

Atlantic (France)
40 252 – Formidable Rhythm N Blues, Volume 1 – Various Artists [1972] Issued in mono only.
40 253 – Formidable Rhythm N Blues, Volume 2 – Various Artists [1972] Issued in mono only.
40 254 – Formidable Rhythm N Blues, Volume 3 – Various Artists [1972] Issued in mono only.
40 255 – Formidable Rhythm N Blues, Volume 4 – Various Artists [1972] Issued in mono only.
40 256 – Formidable Rhythm N Blues, Volume 5 – Various Artists [1972] Issued in mono only.
40 258 – Formidable Rhythm N Blues, Volume 8 – Various Artists [1972] Issued in mono only.
40 259 – Formidable Rhythm N Blues, Volume 9 – Various Artists [1972] Issued in mono only.
40 260 – Formidable Rhythm N Blues, Volume 10 – Various Artists [1972] Issued in mono only.
40 261 – Formidable Rhythm N Blues, Volume 11 – Various Artists [1972] Issued in mono only.
40 570 – Formidable Rhythm N Blues, Volume 7 – Various Artists [1972] Issued in mono only.
40 659 – Formidable Rhythm N Blues, Volume 6 – Various Artists [1972] Issued in mono only.

Atlantic (Germany)
ATL 20 034 – Heavy & Alive – Various Artists [1972]
ATL 50 734 – Sweet Soul Music – Various Artists [1981]
ATL 50 836 – Sweet Soul Music, Volume 2 – Various Artists [1981]

Atlantic (Japan)
P-4579 – Drifters Golden Hits – Drifters. Reissue of Atlantic 8153 with the same cover graphics. 
P-4580 – Rock and Roll – Ray Charles. Reissue of Atlantic 8006 with the same cover graphics.
P-4581 – Rock and Roll – La Vern Baker. Reissue of Atlantic 8007 with the same cover graphics. 
P-4582 – New Orleans Piano – Professor Longhair. Reissue of Atco SD-7225.
P-4583 – The Coasters. Reissue of Atco 33-101 with the same cover graphics.
P-4584 – Clyde – Clyde McPhatter. Reissue of Atlantic 8031 with the same cover graphics.
P-4585 – Rock and Roll – Ruth Brown. Reissue of Atlantic 8004 with the same cover graphics.
P-4586 – Rock and Roll – Joe Turner. Reissue of Atlantic 8005 with the same cover graphics. 
P-4587 – King of the Stroll – Chuck Willis Reissue of Atlantic 8018 with the same cover graphics.
P-4588 – The Clovers. Reissue of Atlantic 8009 with the same cover graphics.
P-4589 – Atlantic Blues Special – Various Artists
P-4590 – Atlantic Do Wap Special – Various Artists
P-11570 – History of Rock & Roll (Atlantic Masterpieces) '55-'63 – Various Artists [1980s]

Atlantic (UK)
K 20024 – The New Age of Atlantic – Various Artists [1972]
K 20040X – Ben E. King – Ben E. King [1981] 
K 20072 – That's Soul, Vol. 5 – Various Artists [1969]
K 50164 – Atlantic Black Gold, Volume 2 – Various Artists [1975]

References

External links
Discogs
Atlantic Records Discography Project
The Atlantic Records Story

 
Discographies of American record labels